

155001–155100 

|-bgcolor=#fefefe
| 155001 ||  || — || July 11, 2005 || Kitt Peak || Spacewatch || V || align=right data-sort-value="0.90" | 900 m || 
|-id=002 bgcolor=#FA8072
| 155002 ||  || — || July 12, 2005 || Catalina || CSS || — || align=right | 1.6 km || 
|-id=003 bgcolor=#d6d6d6
| 155003 ||  || — || July 10, 2005 || Catalina || CSS || EUP || align=right | 6.0 km || 
|-id=004 bgcolor=#E9E9E9
| 155004 ||  || — || July 27, 2005 || Palomar || NEAT || — || align=right | 2.2 km || 
|-id=005 bgcolor=#fefefe
| 155005 ||  || — || July 31, 2005 || Siding Spring || SSS || — || align=right | 1.5 km || 
|-id=006 bgcolor=#fefefe
| 155006 ||  || — || July 31, 2005 || Siding Spring || SSS || — || align=right | 1.5 km || 
|-id=007 bgcolor=#E9E9E9
| 155007 ||  || — || July 28, 2005 || Reedy Creek || J. Broughton || — || align=right | 3.3 km || 
|-id=008 bgcolor=#fefefe
| 155008 ||  || — || July 29, 2005 || Palomar || NEAT || NYS || align=right | 1.0 km || 
|-id=009 bgcolor=#fefefe
| 155009 ||  || — || July 31, 2005 || Palomar || NEAT || V || align=right data-sort-value="0.98" | 980 m || 
|-id=010 bgcolor=#fefefe
| 155010 ||  || — || August 4, 2005 || Palomar || NEAT || NYS || align=right data-sort-value="0.76" | 760 m || 
|-id=011 bgcolor=#d6d6d6
| 155011 ||  || — || August 6, 2005 || Siding Spring || SSS || — || align=right | 5.2 km || 
|-id=012 bgcolor=#fefefe
| 155012 ||  || — || August 24, 2005 || Palomar || NEAT || MAS || align=right | 1.3 km || 
|-id=013 bgcolor=#fefefe
| 155013 ||  || — || August 24, 2005 || Palomar || NEAT || NYS || align=right data-sort-value="0.90" | 900 m || 
|-id=014 bgcolor=#fefefe
| 155014 ||  || — || August 24, 2005 || Palomar || NEAT || — || align=right | 2.8 km || 
|-id=015 bgcolor=#fefefe
| 155015 ||  || — || August 25, 2005 || Palomar || NEAT || V || align=right | 1.1 km || 
|-id=016 bgcolor=#E9E9E9
| 155016 ||  || — || August 25, 2005 || Campo Imperatore || CINEOS || — || align=right | 1.3 km || 
|-id=017 bgcolor=#E9E9E9
| 155017 ||  || — || August 27, 2005 || Kitt Peak || Spacewatch || ADE || align=right | 2.5 km || 
|-id=018 bgcolor=#fefefe
| 155018 ||  || — || August 28, 2005 || Vicques || M. Ory || FLO || align=right data-sort-value="0.97" | 970 m || 
|-id=019 bgcolor=#fefefe
| 155019 ||  || — || August 24, 2005 || Palomar || NEAT || NYS || align=right | 1.0 km || 
|-id=020 bgcolor=#E9E9E9
| 155020 ||  || — || August 25, 2005 || Palomar || NEAT || GER || align=right | 1.7 km || 
|-id=021 bgcolor=#fefefe
| 155021 ||  || — || August 26, 2005 || Anderson Mesa || LONEOS || NYS || align=right | 1.2 km || 
|-id=022 bgcolor=#fefefe
| 155022 ||  || — || August 26, 2005 || Palomar || NEAT || — || align=right | 1.2 km || 
|-id=023 bgcolor=#fefefe
| 155023 ||  || — || August 28, 2005 || Kitt Peak || Spacewatch || — || align=right | 1.1 km || 
|-id=024 bgcolor=#fefefe
| 155024 ||  || — || August 28, 2005 || Anderson Mesa || LONEOS || EUT || align=right data-sort-value="0.92" | 920 m || 
|-id=025 bgcolor=#E9E9E9
| 155025 ||  || — || August 29, 2005 || Socorro || LINEAR || — || align=right | 3.1 km || 
|-id=026 bgcolor=#E9E9E9
| 155026 ||  || — || August 29, 2005 || Socorro || LINEAR || — || align=right | 4.6 km || 
|-id=027 bgcolor=#E9E9E9
| 155027 ||  || — || August 26, 2005 || Anderson Mesa || LONEOS || — || align=right | 2.5 km || 
|-id=028 bgcolor=#E9E9E9
| 155028 ||  || — || August 29, 2005 || Socorro || LINEAR || — || align=right | 3.6 km || 
|-id=029 bgcolor=#E9E9E9
| 155029 ||  || — || August 29, 2005 || Anderson Mesa || LONEOS || — || align=right | 2.7 km || 
|-id=030 bgcolor=#d6d6d6
| 155030 ||  || — || August 29, 2005 || Anderson Mesa || LONEOS || — || align=right | 3.9 km || 
|-id=031 bgcolor=#d6d6d6
| 155031 ||  || — || August 27, 2005 || Palomar || NEAT || — || align=right | 4.2 km || 
|-id=032 bgcolor=#fefefe
| 155032 ||  || — || August 27, 2005 || Palomar || NEAT || FLO || align=right | 1.0 km || 
|-id=033 bgcolor=#fefefe
| 155033 ||  || — || August 28, 2005 || Kitt Peak || Spacewatch || NYS || align=right data-sort-value="0.94" | 940 m || 
|-id=034 bgcolor=#E9E9E9
| 155034 ||  || — || August 28, 2005 || Kitt Peak || Spacewatch || — || align=right | 2.0 km || 
|-id=035 bgcolor=#fefefe
| 155035 ||  || — || August 28, 2005 || Kitt Peak || Spacewatch || — || align=right | 2.0 km || 
|-id=036 bgcolor=#fefefe
| 155036 ||  || — || August 28, 2005 || Kitt Peak || Spacewatch || MAS || align=right | 1.1 km || 
|-id=037 bgcolor=#fefefe
| 155037 ||  || — || August 31, 2005 || Anderson Mesa || LONEOS || — || align=right | 1.5 km || 
|-id=038 bgcolor=#fefefe
| 155038 ||  || — || August 28, 2005 || Kitt Peak || Spacewatch || NYS || align=right | 2.8 km || 
|-id=039 bgcolor=#d6d6d6
| 155039 ||  || — || August 31, 2005 || Palomar || NEAT || EOS || align=right | 2.7 km || 
|-id=040 bgcolor=#fefefe
| 155040 ||  || — || August 29, 2005 || Palomar || NEAT || — || align=right | 1.5 km || 
|-id=041 bgcolor=#fefefe
| 155041 ||  || — || August 29, 2005 || Palomar || NEAT || — || align=right data-sort-value="0.97" | 970 m || 
|-id=042 bgcolor=#fefefe
| 155042 ||  || — || September 2, 2005 || Campo Imperatore || CINEOS || — || align=right | 1.3 km || 
|-id=043 bgcolor=#fefefe
| 155043 ||  || — || September 5, 2005 || Haleakala || NEAT || — || align=right | 1.3 km || 
|-id=044 bgcolor=#d6d6d6
| 155044 ||  || — || September 8, 2005 || Socorro || LINEAR || 637 || align=right | 3.6 km || 
|-id=045 bgcolor=#fefefe
| 155045 ||  || — || September 8, 2005 || Socorro || LINEAR || NYS || align=right | 1.3 km || 
|-id=046 bgcolor=#E9E9E9
| 155046 ||  || — || September 3, 2005 || Palomar || NEAT || EUN || align=right | 1.9 km || 
|-id=047 bgcolor=#fefefe
| 155047 ||  || — || September 8, 2005 || Socorro || LINEAR || NYS || align=right | 1.0 km || 
|-id=048 bgcolor=#E9E9E9
| 155048 ||  || — || September 11, 2005 || Anderson Mesa || LONEOS || — || align=right | 4.1 km || 
|-id=049 bgcolor=#d6d6d6
| 155049 ||  || — || September 10, 2005 || Anderson Mesa || LONEOS || — || align=right | 5.0 km || 
|-id=050 bgcolor=#fefefe
| 155050 ||  || — || September 10, 2005 || Anderson Mesa || LONEOS || V || align=right | 1.1 km || 
|-id=051 bgcolor=#E9E9E9
| 155051 ||  || — || September 11, 2005 || Anderson Mesa || LONEOS || MAR || align=right | 2.1 km || 
|-id=052 bgcolor=#fefefe
| 155052 ||  || — || September 23, 2005 || Catalina || CSS || MAS || align=right | 1.2 km || 
|-id=053 bgcolor=#E9E9E9
| 155053 ||  || — || September 25, 2005 || Kitt Peak || Spacewatch || EUN || align=right | 2.3 km || 
|-id=054 bgcolor=#fefefe
| 155054 ||  || — || September 25, 2005 || Rehoboth || Calvin–Rehoboth Obs. || — || align=right | 1.0 km || 
|-id=055 bgcolor=#E9E9E9
| 155055 ||  || — || September 23, 2005 || Catalina || CSS || EUN || align=right | 1.6 km || 
|-id=056 bgcolor=#fefefe
| 155056 ||  || — || September 24, 2005 || Anderson Mesa || LONEOS || NYS || align=right | 1.3 km || 
|-id=057 bgcolor=#E9E9E9
| 155057 ||  || — || September 24, 2005 || Anderson Mesa || LONEOS || — || align=right | 2.6 km || 
|-id=058 bgcolor=#fefefe
| 155058 ||  || — || September 24, 2005 || Anderson Mesa || LONEOS || V || align=right | 1.2 km || 
|-id=059 bgcolor=#fefefe
| 155059 ||  || — || September 23, 2005 || Kitt Peak || Spacewatch || — || align=right | 1.0 km || 
|-id=060 bgcolor=#fefefe
| 155060 ||  || — || September 23, 2005 || Kitt Peak || Spacewatch || — || align=right | 1.4 km || 
|-id=061 bgcolor=#fefefe
| 155061 ||  || — || September 23, 2005 || Catalina || CSS || V || align=right | 1.2 km || 
|-id=062 bgcolor=#E9E9E9
| 155062 ||  || — || September 23, 2005 || Kitt Peak || Spacewatch || HOF || align=right | 4.4 km || 
|-id=063 bgcolor=#fefefe
| 155063 ||  || — || September 23, 2005 || Kitt Peak || Spacewatch || — || align=right | 1.5 km || 
|-id=064 bgcolor=#fefefe
| 155064 ||  || — || September 24, 2005 || Kitt Peak || Spacewatch || — || align=right | 1.1 km || 
|-id=065 bgcolor=#fefefe
| 155065 ||  || — || September 24, 2005 || Kitt Peak || Spacewatch || H || align=right data-sort-value="0.97" | 970 m || 
|-id=066 bgcolor=#E9E9E9
| 155066 ||  || — || September 25, 2005 || Kitt Peak || Spacewatch || AGN || align=right | 2.3 km || 
|-id=067 bgcolor=#fefefe
| 155067 ||  || — || September 26, 2005 || Rehoboth || Calvin–Rehoboth Obs. || NYS || align=right data-sort-value="0.86" | 860 m || 
|-id=068 bgcolor=#fefefe
| 155068 ||  || — || September 26, 2005 || Kitt Peak || Spacewatch || FLO || align=right | 1.2 km || 
|-id=069 bgcolor=#fefefe
| 155069 ||  || — || September 26, 2005 || Palomar || NEAT || — || align=right | 1.3 km || 
|-id=070 bgcolor=#fefefe
| 155070 ||  || — || September 27, 2005 || Kitt Peak || Spacewatch || V || align=right | 1.1 km || 
|-id=071 bgcolor=#fefefe
| 155071 ||  || — || September 23, 2005 || Catalina || CSS || — || align=right data-sort-value="0.82" | 820 m || 
|-id=072 bgcolor=#E9E9E9
| 155072 ||  || — || September 23, 2005 || Kitt Peak || Spacewatch || — || align=right | 2.2 km || 
|-id=073 bgcolor=#fefefe
| 155073 ||  || — || September 24, 2005 || Kitt Peak || Spacewatch || MAS || align=right data-sort-value="0.97" | 970 m || 
|-id=074 bgcolor=#E9E9E9
| 155074 ||  || — || September 24, 2005 || Kitt Peak || Spacewatch || — || align=right | 1.9 km || 
|-id=075 bgcolor=#fefefe
| 155075 ||  || — || September 25, 2005 || Palomar || NEAT || — || align=right | 1.1 km || 
|-id=076 bgcolor=#fefefe
| 155076 ||  || — || September 25, 2005 || Palomar || NEAT || — || align=right | 1.4 km || 
|-id=077 bgcolor=#E9E9E9
| 155077 ||  || — || September 25, 2005 || Palomar || NEAT || — || align=right | 3.3 km || 
|-id=078 bgcolor=#d6d6d6
| 155078 ||  || — || September 25, 2005 || Kitt Peak || Spacewatch || THM || align=right | 3.2 km || 
|-id=079 bgcolor=#E9E9E9
| 155079 ||  || — || September 26, 2005 || Palomar || NEAT || — || align=right | 3.1 km || 
|-id=080 bgcolor=#fefefe
| 155080 ||  || — || September 29, 2005 || Anderson Mesa || LONEOS || — || align=right | 1.3 km || 
|-id=081 bgcolor=#fefefe
| 155081 ||  || — || September 29, 2005 || Anderson Mesa || LONEOS || NYS || align=right | 1.2 km || 
|-id=082 bgcolor=#E9E9E9
| 155082 ||  || — || September 29, 2005 || Catalina || CSS || ADE || align=right | 1.8 km || 
|-id=083 bgcolor=#d6d6d6
| 155083 Banneker ||  ||  || September 30, 2005 || Calvin-Rehoboth || L. A. Molnar || — || align=right | 2.9 km || 
|-id=084 bgcolor=#d6d6d6
| 155084 ||  || — || September 24, 2005 || Kitt Peak || Spacewatch || — || align=right | 2.9 km || 
|-id=085 bgcolor=#E9E9E9
| 155085 ||  || — || September 25, 2005 || Kitt Peak || Spacewatch || — || align=right | 1.9 km || 
|-id=086 bgcolor=#fefefe
| 155086 ||  || — || September 25, 2005 || Kitt Peak || Spacewatch || NYS || align=right | 1.1 km || 
|-id=087 bgcolor=#d6d6d6
| 155087 ||  || — || September 25, 2005 || Kitt Peak || Spacewatch || — || align=right | 2.8 km || 
|-id=088 bgcolor=#E9E9E9
| 155088 ||  || — || September 26, 2005 || Kitt Peak || Spacewatch || ADE || align=right | 5.8 km || 
|-id=089 bgcolor=#E9E9E9
| 155089 ||  || — || September 26, 2005 || Kitt Peak || Spacewatch || — || align=right | 3.5 km || 
|-id=090 bgcolor=#fefefe
| 155090 ||  || — || September 27, 2005 || Palomar || NEAT || — || align=right | 1.3 km || 
|-id=091 bgcolor=#E9E9E9
| 155091 ||  || — || September 27, 2005 || Palomar || NEAT || — || align=right | 2.8 km || 
|-id=092 bgcolor=#E9E9E9
| 155092 ||  || — || September 29, 2005 || Kitt Peak || Spacewatch || — || align=right | 1.0 km || 
|-id=093 bgcolor=#fefefe
| 155093 ||  || — || September 29, 2005 || Kitt Peak || Spacewatch || NYS || align=right data-sort-value="0.84" | 840 m || 
|-id=094 bgcolor=#E9E9E9
| 155094 ||  || — || September 29, 2005 || Mount Lemmon || Mount Lemmon Survey || — || align=right | 1.9 km || 
|-id=095 bgcolor=#fefefe
| 155095 ||  || — || September 29, 2005 || Kitt Peak || Spacewatch || — || align=right | 1.1 km || 
|-id=096 bgcolor=#E9E9E9
| 155096 ||  || — || September 30, 2005 || Anderson Mesa || LONEOS || HNS || align=right | 1.9 km || 
|-id=097 bgcolor=#fefefe
| 155097 ||  || — || September 30, 2005 || Palomar || NEAT || NYS || align=right | 1.00 km || 
|-id=098 bgcolor=#d6d6d6
| 155098 ||  || — || September 30, 2005 || Catalina || CSS || — || align=right | 6.2 km || 
|-id=099 bgcolor=#fefefe
| 155099 ||  || — || September 30, 2005 || Catalina || CSS || — || align=right | 1.7 km || 
|-id=100 bgcolor=#d6d6d6
| 155100 ||  || — || September 30, 2005 || Catalina || CSS || — || align=right | 5.3 km || 
|}

155101–155200 

|-bgcolor=#fefefe
| 155101 ||  || — || September 30, 2005 || Palomar || NEAT || FLO || align=right | 1.1 km || 
|-id=102 bgcolor=#E9E9E9
| 155102 ||  || — || September 30, 2005 || Mount Lemmon || Mount Lemmon Survey || — || align=right | 3.6 km || 
|-id=103 bgcolor=#fefefe
| 155103 ||  || — || September 29, 2005 || Palomar || NEAT || — || align=right | 1.2 km || 
|-id=104 bgcolor=#E9E9E9
| 155104 ||  || — || September 29, 2005 || Catalina || CSS || — || align=right | 2.0 km || 
|-id=105 bgcolor=#fefefe
| 155105 ||  || — || September 30, 2005 || Kitt Peak || Spacewatch || — || align=right | 1.1 km || 
|-id=106 bgcolor=#fefefe
| 155106 ||  || — || September 30, 2005 || Mount Lemmon || Mount Lemmon Survey || — || align=right data-sort-value="0.98" | 980 m || 
|-id=107 bgcolor=#d6d6d6
| 155107 ||  || — || September 29, 2005 || Kitt Peak || Spacewatch || 637 || align=right | 4.4 km || 
|-id=108 bgcolor=#fefefe
| 155108 ||  || — || September 30, 2005 || Mount Lemmon || Mount Lemmon Survey || — || align=right data-sort-value="0.96" | 960 m || 
|-id=109 bgcolor=#fefefe
| 155109 ||  || — || September 30, 2005 || Mount Lemmon || Mount Lemmon Survey || — || align=right data-sort-value="0.96" | 960 m || 
|-id=110 bgcolor=#FFC2E0
| 155110 || 2005 TB || — || October 1, 2005 || Catalina || CSS || APO +1km || align=right data-sort-value="0.68" | 680 m || 
|-id=111 bgcolor=#E9E9E9
| 155111 ||  || — || October 1, 2005 || Catalina || CSS || — || align=right | 3.3 km || 
|-id=112 bgcolor=#fefefe
| 155112 ||  || — || October 1, 2005 || Mount Lemmon || Mount Lemmon Survey || — || align=right | 2.2 km || 
|-id=113 bgcolor=#E9E9E9
| 155113 ||  || — || October 3, 2005 || Palomar || NEAT || — || align=right | 3.1 km || 
|-id=114 bgcolor=#fefefe
| 155114 ||  || — || October 4, 2005 || Catalina || CSS || V || align=right | 1.0 km || 
|-id=115 bgcolor=#d6d6d6
| 155115 ||  || — || October 1, 2005 || Anderson Mesa || LONEOS || — || align=right | 3.8 km || 
|-id=116 bgcolor=#d6d6d6
| 155116 Verkhivnya ||  ||  || October 8, 2005 || Andrushivka || Andrushivka Obs. || LIX || align=right | 5.5 km || 
|-id=117 bgcolor=#fefefe
| 155117 ||  || — || October 9, 2005 || Goodricke-Pigott || Goodricke-Pigott Obs. || NYS || align=right data-sort-value="0.97" | 970 m || 
|-id=118 bgcolor=#E9E9E9
| 155118 ||  || — || October 12, 2005 || RAS || R. Hutsebaut || NEM || align=right | 3.7 km || 
|-id=119 bgcolor=#E9E9E9
| 155119 ||  || — || October 6, 2005 || Kitt Peak || Spacewatch || — || align=right | 4.3 km || 
|-id=120 bgcolor=#fefefe
| 155120 ||  || — || October 1, 2005 || Kitt Peak || Spacewatch || — || align=right | 1.3 km || 
|-id=121 bgcolor=#d6d6d6
| 155121 ||  || — || October 5, 2005 || Catalina || CSS || — || align=right | 3.9 km || 
|-id=122 bgcolor=#d6d6d6
| 155122 ||  || — || October 5, 2005 || Catalina || CSS || EOS || align=right | 2.8 km || 
|-id=123 bgcolor=#E9E9E9
| 155123 ||  || — || October 7, 2005 || Catalina || CSS || — || align=right | 4.3 km || 
|-id=124 bgcolor=#fefefe
| 155124 ||  || — || October 7, 2005 || Catalina || CSS || V || align=right data-sort-value="0.99" | 990 m || 
|-id=125 bgcolor=#d6d6d6
| 155125 ||  || — || October 5, 2005 || Kitt Peak || Spacewatch || SHU3:2 || align=right | 8.6 km || 
|-id=126 bgcolor=#fefefe
| 155126 ||  || — || October 7, 2005 || Kitt Peak || Spacewatch || NYS || align=right data-sort-value="0.77" | 770 m || 
|-id=127 bgcolor=#E9E9E9
| 155127 ||  || — || October 7, 2005 || Kitt Peak || Spacewatch || — || align=right | 1.1 km || 
|-id=128 bgcolor=#fefefe
| 155128 ||  || — || October 7, 2005 || Kitt Peak || Spacewatch || NYS || align=right data-sort-value="0.84" | 840 m || 
|-id=129 bgcolor=#E9E9E9
| 155129 ||  || — || October 7, 2005 || Catalina || CSS || EUN || align=right | 1.6 km || 
|-id=130 bgcolor=#fefefe
| 155130 ||  || — || October 7, 2005 || Kitt Peak || Spacewatch || MAS || align=right data-sort-value="0.82" | 820 m || 
|-id=131 bgcolor=#E9E9E9
| 155131 ||  || — || October 7, 2005 || Kitt Peak || Spacewatch || — || align=right | 3.3 km || 
|-id=132 bgcolor=#fefefe
| 155132 ||  || — || October 7, 2005 || Kitt Peak || Spacewatch || MAS || align=right | 1.1 km || 
|-id=133 bgcolor=#fefefe
| 155133 ||  || — || October 8, 2005 || Kitt Peak || Spacewatch || — || align=right data-sort-value="0.95" | 950 m || 
|-id=134 bgcolor=#fefefe
| 155134 ||  || — || October 5, 2005 || Catalina || CSS || — || align=right | 1.5 km || 
|-id=135 bgcolor=#d6d6d6
| 155135 ||  || — || October 9, 2005 || Kitt Peak || Spacewatch || — || align=right | 4.3 km || 
|-id=136 bgcolor=#fefefe
| 155136 ||  || — || October 9, 2005 || Kitt Peak || Spacewatch || — || align=right | 1.2 km || 
|-id=137 bgcolor=#E9E9E9
| 155137 ||  || — || October 9, 2005 || Kitt Peak || Spacewatch || HEN || align=right | 1.4 km || 
|-id=138 bgcolor=#E9E9E9
| 155138 Pucinskas ||  ||  || October 9, 2005 || Moletai || K. Černis, J. Zdanavičius || MRX || align=right | 1.7 km || 
|-id=139 bgcolor=#fefefe
| 155139 ||  || — || October 13, 2005 || Socorro || LINEAR || V || align=right data-sort-value="0.99" | 990 m || 
|-id=140 bgcolor=#FFC2E0
| 155140 || 2005 UD || — || October 22, 2005 || Catalina || CSS || APO +1km || align=right | 1.1 km || 
|-id=141 bgcolor=#fefefe
| 155141 || 2005 UY || — || October 20, 2005 || Junk Bond || D. Healy || — || align=right | 1.3 km || 
|-id=142 bgcolor=#E9E9E9
| 155142 Tenagra ||  ||  || October 26, 2005 || Tenagra II || J.-C. Merlin || AST || align=right | 2.2 km || 
|-id=143 bgcolor=#E9E9E9
| 155143 ||  || — || October 21, 2005 || Palomar || NEAT || — || align=right | 1.2 km || 
|-id=144 bgcolor=#E9E9E9
| 155144 ||  || — || October 22, 2005 || Kitt Peak || Spacewatch || AST || align=right | 3.0 km || 
|-id=145 bgcolor=#fefefe
| 155145 ||  || — || October 22, 2005 || Kitt Peak || Spacewatch || — || align=right | 1.2 km || 
|-id=146 bgcolor=#fefefe
| 155146 ||  || — || October 23, 2005 || Catalina || CSS || NYS || align=right | 1.0 km || 
|-id=147 bgcolor=#fefefe
| 155147 ||  || — || October 23, 2005 || Catalina || CSS || — || align=right | 1.3 km || 
|-id=148 bgcolor=#fefefe
| 155148 ||  || — || October 24, 2005 || Anderson Mesa || LONEOS || — || align=right | 1.1 km || 
|-id=149 bgcolor=#E9E9E9
| 155149 ||  || — || October 25, 2005 || Mount Lemmon || Mount Lemmon Survey || — || align=right | 2.1 km || 
|-id=150 bgcolor=#E9E9E9
| 155150 ||  || — || October 22, 2005 || Palomar || NEAT || — || align=right | 3.7 km || 
|-id=151 bgcolor=#E9E9E9
| 155151 ||  || — || October 23, 2005 || Palomar || NEAT || AGN || align=right | 1.8 km || 
|-id=152 bgcolor=#E9E9E9
| 155152 ||  || — || October 25, 2005 || Mount Lemmon || Mount Lemmon Survey || — || align=right | 1.2 km || 
|-id=153 bgcolor=#d6d6d6
| 155153 ||  || — || October 25, 2005 || Catalina || CSS || KOR || align=right | 2.3 km || 
|-id=154 bgcolor=#E9E9E9
| 155154 ||  || — || October 25, 2005 || Catalina || CSS || MAR || align=right | 2.2 km || 
|-id=155 bgcolor=#d6d6d6
| 155155 ||  || — || October 25, 2005 || Catalina || CSS || — || align=right | 5.6 km || 
|-id=156 bgcolor=#E9E9E9
| 155156 ||  || — || October 25, 2005 || Catalina || CSS || — || align=right | 4.3 km || 
|-id=157 bgcolor=#d6d6d6
| 155157 ||  || — || October 25, 2005 || Catalina || CSS || — || align=right | 4.2 km || 
|-id=158 bgcolor=#E9E9E9
| 155158 ||  || — || October 25, 2005 || Catalina || CSS || — || align=right | 3.4 km || 
|-id=159 bgcolor=#fefefe
| 155159 ||  || — || October 22, 2005 || Kitt Peak || Spacewatch || — || align=right | 1.5 km || 
|-id=160 bgcolor=#fefefe
| 155160 ||  || — || October 22, 2005 || Kitt Peak || Spacewatch || — || align=right | 1.3 km || 
|-id=161 bgcolor=#E9E9E9
| 155161 ||  || — || October 22, 2005 || Kitt Peak || Spacewatch || MAR || align=right | 1.9 km || 
|-id=162 bgcolor=#fefefe
| 155162 ||  || — || October 22, 2005 || Kitt Peak || Spacewatch || SUL || align=right | 3.7 km || 
|-id=163 bgcolor=#d6d6d6
| 155163 ||  || — || October 24, 2005 || Kitt Peak || Spacewatch || — || align=right | 4.6 km || 
|-id=164 bgcolor=#fefefe
| 155164 ||  || — || October 25, 2005 || Catalina || CSS || — || align=right | 2.2 km || 
|-id=165 bgcolor=#E9E9E9
| 155165 ||  || — || October 26, 2005 || Kitt Peak || Spacewatch || AGN || align=right | 2.2 km || 
|-id=166 bgcolor=#d6d6d6
| 155166 ||  || — || October 26, 2005 || Kitt Peak || Spacewatch || — || align=right | 5.3 km || 
|-id=167 bgcolor=#E9E9E9
| 155167 ||  || — || October 24, 2005 || Kitt Peak || Spacewatch || — || align=right | 2.0 km || 
|-id=168 bgcolor=#E9E9E9
| 155168 ||  || — || October 24, 2005 || Kitt Peak || Spacewatch || AGN || align=right | 2.1 km || 
|-id=169 bgcolor=#d6d6d6
| 155169 ||  || — || October 25, 2005 || Mount Lemmon || Mount Lemmon Survey || THM || align=right | 2.7 km || 
|-id=170 bgcolor=#d6d6d6
| 155170 ||  || — || October 27, 2005 || Mount Lemmon || Mount Lemmon Survey || KAR || align=right | 1.7 km || 
|-id=171 bgcolor=#E9E9E9
| 155171 ||  || — || October 26, 2005 || Kitt Peak || Spacewatch || — || align=right | 1.1 km || 
|-id=172 bgcolor=#d6d6d6
| 155172 ||  || — || October 24, 2005 || Palomar || NEAT || BRA || align=right | 2.6 km || 
|-id=173 bgcolor=#E9E9E9
| 155173 ||  || — || October 25, 2005 || Mount Lemmon || Mount Lemmon Survey || — || align=right | 1.7 km || 
|-id=174 bgcolor=#fefefe
| 155174 ||  || — || October 25, 2005 || Kitt Peak || Spacewatch || V || align=right | 1.1 km || 
|-id=175 bgcolor=#fefefe
| 155175 ||  || — || October 28, 2005 || Socorro || LINEAR || NYS || align=right | 1.3 km || 
|-id=176 bgcolor=#fefefe
| 155176 ||  || — || October 28, 2005 || Mount Lemmon || Mount Lemmon Survey || — || align=right data-sort-value="0.94" | 940 m || 
|-id=177 bgcolor=#d6d6d6
| 155177 ||  || — || October 28, 2005 || Kitt Peak || Spacewatch || — || align=right | 3.2 km || 
|-id=178 bgcolor=#fefefe
| 155178 ||  || — || October 28, 2005 || Mount Lemmon || Mount Lemmon Survey || — || align=right | 1.4 km || 
|-id=179 bgcolor=#fefefe
| 155179 ||  || — || October 24, 2005 || Kitt Peak || Spacewatch || — || align=right | 1.0 km || 
|-id=180 bgcolor=#d6d6d6
| 155180 ||  || — || October 26, 2005 || Kitt Peak || Spacewatch || — || align=right | 5.9 km || 
|-id=181 bgcolor=#E9E9E9
| 155181 ||  || — || October 25, 2005 || Kitt Peak || Spacewatch || — || align=right | 3.4 km || 
|-id=182 bgcolor=#E9E9E9
| 155182 ||  || — || October 27, 2005 || Mount Lemmon || Mount Lemmon Survey || — || align=right | 1.6 km || 
|-id=183 bgcolor=#d6d6d6
| 155183 ||  || — || October 29, 2005 || Catalina || CSS || — || align=right | 3.3 km || 
|-id=184 bgcolor=#d6d6d6
| 155184 ||  || — || October 28, 2005 || Catalina || CSS || — || align=right | 4.9 km || 
|-id=185 bgcolor=#d6d6d6
| 155185 ||  || — || October 28, 2005 || Mount Lemmon || Mount Lemmon Survey || — || align=right | 3.6 km || 
|-id=186 bgcolor=#fefefe
| 155186 ||  || — || October 29, 2005 || Mount Lemmon || Mount Lemmon Survey || — || align=right data-sort-value="0.94" | 940 m || 
|-id=187 bgcolor=#E9E9E9
| 155187 ||  || — || October 29, 2005 || Mount Lemmon || Mount Lemmon Survey || — || align=right | 2.6 km || 
|-id=188 bgcolor=#fefefe
| 155188 ||  || — || October 25, 2005 || Catalina || CSS || — || align=right | 1.5 km || 
|-id=189 bgcolor=#E9E9E9
| 155189 ||  || — || October 29, 2005 || Catalina || CSS || MAR || align=right | 2.0 km || 
|-id=190 bgcolor=#d6d6d6
| 155190 ||  || — || October 29, 2005 || Mount Lemmon || Mount Lemmon Survey || KOR || align=right | 2.1 km || 
|-id=191 bgcolor=#E9E9E9
| 155191 ||  || — || October 27, 2005 || Kitt Peak || Spacewatch || HOF || align=right | 3.6 km || 
|-id=192 bgcolor=#E9E9E9
| 155192 ||  || — || October 27, 2005 || Mount Lemmon || Mount Lemmon Survey || MIS || align=right | 3.7 km || 
|-id=193 bgcolor=#E9E9E9
| 155193 ||  || — || October 28, 2005 || Socorro || LINEAR || — || align=right | 1.4 km || 
|-id=194 bgcolor=#d6d6d6
| 155194 ||  || — || October 30, 2005 || Mount Lemmon || Mount Lemmon Survey || KOR || align=right | 1.9 km || 
|-id=195 bgcolor=#E9E9E9
| 155195 ||  || — || October 25, 2005 || Kitt Peak || Spacewatch || — || align=right | 3.3 km || 
|-id=196 bgcolor=#fefefe
| 155196 ||  || — || October 25, 2005 || Kitt Peak || Spacewatch || V || align=right | 1.3 km || 
|-id=197 bgcolor=#d6d6d6
| 155197 ||  || — || October 28, 2005 || Kitt Peak || Spacewatch || — || align=right | 3.3 km || 
|-id=198 bgcolor=#fefefe
| 155198 ||  || — || October 28, 2005 || Kitt Peak || Spacewatch || MAS || align=right | 1.0 km || 
|-id=199 bgcolor=#d6d6d6
| 155199 ||  || — || October 28, 2005 || Kitt Peak || Spacewatch || — || align=right | 4.0 km || 
|-id=200 bgcolor=#fefefe
| 155200 ||  || — || October 27, 2005 || Kitt Peak || Spacewatch || NYS || align=right | 2.7 km || 
|}

155201–155300 

|-bgcolor=#fefefe
| 155201 ||  || — || October 29, 2005 || Mount Lemmon || Mount Lemmon Survey || — || align=right data-sort-value="0.87" | 870 m || 
|-id=202 bgcolor=#fefefe
| 155202 ||  || — || October 30, 2005 || Mount Lemmon || Mount Lemmon Survey || — || align=right | 1.4 km || 
|-id=203 bgcolor=#d6d6d6
| 155203 ||  || — || October 30, 2005 || Mount Lemmon || Mount Lemmon Survey || — || align=right | 3.5 km || 
|-id=204 bgcolor=#fefefe
| 155204 ||  || — || October 31, 2005 || Mount Lemmon || Mount Lemmon Survey || EUT || align=right data-sort-value="0.96" | 960 m || 
|-id=205 bgcolor=#E9E9E9
| 155205 ||  || — || October 30, 2005 || Socorro || LINEAR || JUN || align=right | 3.0 km || 
|-id=206 bgcolor=#E9E9E9
| 155206 ||  || — || October 31, 2005 || Palomar || NEAT || MAR || align=right | 2.1 km || 
|-id=207 bgcolor=#fefefe
| 155207 ||  || — || October 28, 2005 || Mount Lemmon || Mount Lemmon Survey || — || align=right | 1.3 km || 
|-id=208 bgcolor=#E9E9E9
| 155208 ||  || — || October 28, 2005 || Mount Lemmon || Mount Lemmon Survey || — || align=right | 2.2 km || 
|-id=209 bgcolor=#E9E9E9
| 155209 ||  || — || October 31, 2005 || Catalina || CSS || HNS || align=right | 2.0 km || 
|-id=210 bgcolor=#fefefe
| 155210 ||  || — || October 22, 2005 || Catalina || CSS || — || align=right | 1.2 km || 
|-id=211 bgcolor=#fefefe
| 155211 ||  || — || October 22, 2005 || Catalina || CSS || — || align=right | 1.6 km || 
|-id=212 bgcolor=#d6d6d6
| 155212 ||  || — || October 23, 2005 || Catalina || CSS || — || align=right | 5.3 km || 
|-id=213 bgcolor=#d6d6d6
| 155213 ||  || — || October 25, 2005 || Catalina || CSS || EOS || align=right | 4.1 km || 
|-id=214 bgcolor=#E9E9E9
| 155214 ||  || — || October 25, 2005 || Kitt Peak || Spacewatch || WIT || align=right | 1.5 km || 
|-id=215 bgcolor=#fefefe
| 155215 Vámostibor ||  ||  || November 4, 2005 || Piszkéstető || K. Sárneczky || NYS || align=right | 1.1 km || 
|-id=216 bgcolor=#d6d6d6
| 155216 ||  || — || November 5, 2005 || Great Shefford || P. Birtwhistle || CHA || align=right | 3.6 km || 
|-id=217 bgcolor=#E9E9E9
| 155217 Radnóti ||  ||  || November 9, 2005 || Piszkéstető || K. Sárneczky || — || align=right | 2.1 km || 
|-id=218 bgcolor=#E9E9E9
| 155218 ||  || — || November 13, 2005 || Socorro || LINEAR || — || align=right | 4.7 km || 
|-id=219 bgcolor=#d6d6d6
| 155219 ||  || — || November 1, 2005 || Kitt Peak || Spacewatch || KOR || align=right | 2.1 km || 
|-id=220 bgcolor=#E9E9E9
| 155220 ||  || — || November 2, 2005 || Socorro || LINEAR || GEF || align=right | 1.9 km || 
|-id=221 bgcolor=#d6d6d6
| 155221 ||  || — || November 3, 2005 || Mount Lemmon || Mount Lemmon Survey || — || align=right | 3.8 km || 
|-id=222 bgcolor=#E9E9E9
| 155222 ||  || — || November 3, 2005 || Mount Lemmon || Mount Lemmon Survey || AGN || align=right | 1.7 km || 
|-id=223 bgcolor=#fefefe
| 155223 ||  || — || November 3, 2005 || Mount Lemmon || Mount Lemmon Survey || — || align=right | 1.6 km || 
|-id=224 bgcolor=#fefefe
| 155224 ||  || — || November 5, 2005 || Kitt Peak || Spacewatch || MAS || align=right | 1.0 km || 
|-id=225 bgcolor=#fefefe
| 155225 ||  || — || November 1, 2005 || Mount Lemmon || Mount Lemmon Survey || NYS || align=right data-sort-value="0.75" | 750 m || 
|-id=226 bgcolor=#E9E9E9
| 155226 ||  || — || November 1, 2005 || Mount Lemmon || Mount Lemmon Survey || HEN || align=right | 1.4 km || 
|-id=227 bgcolor=#E9E9E9
| 155227 ||  || — || November 1, 2005 || Mount Lemmon || Mount Lemmon Survey || — || align=right | 2.7 km || 
|-id=228 bgcolor=#E9E9E9
| 155228 ||  || — || November 7, 2005 || Socorro || LINEAR || — || align=right | 2.5 km || 
|-id=229 bgcolor=#fefefe
| 155229 ||  || — || November 15, 2005 || Palomar || NEAT || — || align=right | 1.5 km || 
|-id=230 bgcolor=#d6d6d6
| 155230 ||  || — || November 15, 2005 || Palomar || NEAT || — || align=right | 7.6 km || 
|-id=231 bgcolor=#d6d6d6
| 155231 ||  || — || November 19, 2005 || Palomar || NEAT || VER || align=right | 4.4 km || 
|-id=232 bgcolor=#E9E9E9
| 155232 ||  || — || November 20, 2005 || Palomar || NEAT || — || align=right | 2.9 km || 
|-id=233 bgcolor=#E9E9E9
| 155233 ||  || — || November 21, 2005 || Kitt Peak || Spacewatch || — || align=right | 2.8 km || 
|-id=234 bgcolor=#E9E9E9
| 155234 ||  || — || November 22, 2005 || Kitt Peak || Spacewatch || — || align=right | 1.5 km || 
|-id=235 bgcolor=#E9E9E9
| 155235 ||  || — || November 22, 2005 || Kitt Peak || Spacewatch || — || align=right | 3.8 km || 
|-id=236 bgcolor=#E9E9E9
| 155236 ||  || — || November 22, 2005 || Kitt Peak || Spacewatch || HEN || align=right | 1.9 km || 
|-id=237 bgcolor=#E9E9E9
| 155237 ||  || — || November 22, 2005 || Kitt Peak || Spacewatch || AST || align=right | 2.3 km || 
|-id=238 bgcolor=#E9E9E9
| 155238 ||  || — || November 22, 2005 || Kitt Peak || Spacewatch || — || align=right | 3.5 km || 
|-id=239 bgcolor=#d6d6d6
| 155239 ||  || — || November 22, 2005 || Kitt Peak || Spacewatch || — || align=right | 3.6 km || 
|-id=240 bgcolor=#d6d6d6
| 155240 ||  || — || November 21, 2005 || Kitt Peak || Spacewatch || — || align=right | 4.2 km || 
|-id=241 bgcolor=#E9E9E9
| 155241 ||  || — || November 21, 2005 || Kitt Peak || Spacewatch || — || align=right | 2.5 km || 
|-id=242 bgcolor=#d6d6d6
| 155242 ||  || — || November 21, 2005 || Kitt Peak || Spacewatch || HYG || align=right | 5.0 km || 
|-id=243 bgcolor=#d6d6d6
| 155243 ||  || — || November 21, 2005 || Kitt Peak || Spacewatch || — || align=right | 3.6 km || 
|-id=244 bgcolor=#d6d6d6
| 155244 ||  || — || November 21, 2005 || Kitt Peak || Spacewatch || — || align=right | 2.8 km || 
|-id=245 bgcolor=#d6d6d6
| 155245 ||  || — || November 22, 2005 || Kitt Peak || Spacewatch || — || align=right | 4.3 km || 
|-id=246 bgcolor=#E9E9E9
| 155246 ||  || — || November 21, 2005 || Kitt Peak || Spacewatch || — || align=right | 1.8 km || 
|-id=247 bgcolor=#E9E9E9
| 155247 ||  || — || November 22, 2005 || Junk Bond || D. Healy || — || align=right | 2.4 km || 
|-id=248 bgcolor=#d6d6d6
| 155248 ||  || — || November 24, 2005 || Palomar || NEAT || — || align=right | 5.5 km || 
|-id=249 bgcolor=#E9E9E9
| 155249 ||  || — || November 25, 2005 || Kitt Peak || Spacewatch || — || align=right | 2.7 km || 
|-id=250 bgcolor=#E9E9E9
| 155250 ||  || — || November 25, 2005 || Catalina || CSS || — || align=right | 1.5 km || 
|-id=251 bgcolor=#d6d6d6
| 155251 ||  || — || November 29, 2005 || Socorro || LINEAR || — || align=right | 3.8 km || 
|-id=252 bgcolor=#fefefe
| 155252 ||  || — || November 25, 2005 || Mount Lemmon || Mount Lemmon Survey || — || align=right | 1.3 km || 
|-id=253 bgcolor=#d6d6d6
| 155253 ||  || — || November 22, 2005 || Kitt Peak || Spacewatch || KOR || align=right | 1.8 km || 
|-id=254 bgcolor=#d6d6d6
| 155254 ||  || — || November 22, 2005 || Kitt Peak || Spacewatch || KOR || align=right | 2.0 km || 
|-id=255 bgcolor=#E9E9E9
| 155255 ||  || — || November 25, 2005 || Catalina || CSS || JUN || align=right | 2.0 km || 
|-id=256 bgcolor=#fefefe
| 155256 ||  || — || November 25, 2005 || Kitt Peak || Spacewatch || NYS || align=right | 1.1 km || 
|-id=257 bgcolor=#d6d6d6
| 155257 ||  || — || November 26, 2005 || Mount Lemmon || Mount Lemmon Survey || — || align=right | 3.9 km || 
|-id=258 bgcolor=#fefefe
| 155258 ||  || — || November 28, 2005 || Mount Lemmon || Mount Lemmon Survey || FLO || align=right | 2.3 km || 
|-id=259 bgcolor=#E9E9E9
| 155259 ||  || — || November 28, 2005 || Mount Lemmon || Mount Lemmon Survey || — || align=right | 2.0 km || 
|-id=260 bgcolor=#E9E9E9
| 155260 ||  || — || November 25, 2005 || Mount Lemmon || Mount Lemmon Survey || — || align=right | 3.3 km || 
|-id=261 bgcolor=#E9E9E9
| 155261 ||  || — || November 26, 2005 || Kitt Peak || Spacewatch || — || align=right | 1.4 km || 
|-id=262 bgcolor=#d6d6d6
| 155262 ||  || — || November 26, 2005 || Kitt Peak || Spacewatch || — || align=right | 5.7 km || 
|-id=263 bgcolor=#E9E9E9
| 155263 ||  || — || November 28, 2005 || Kitt Peak || Spacewatch || — || align=right | 1.8 km || 
|-id=264 bgcolor=#d6d6d6
| 155264 ||  || — || November 28, 2005 || Mount Lemmon || Mount Lemmon Survey || HYG || align=right | 5.1 km || 
|-id=265 bgcolor=#E9E9E9
| 155265 ||  || — || November 26, 2005 || Catalina || CSS || WIT || align=right | 1.6 km || 
|-id=266 bgcolor=#d6d6d6
| 155266 ||  || — || November 29, 2005 || Kitt Peak || Spacewatch || THM || align=right | 3.9 km || 
|-id=267 bgcolor=#d6d6d6
| 155267 ||  || — || November 29, 2005 || Socorro || LINEAR || KOR || align=right | 2.3 km || 
|-id=268 bgcolor=#E9E9E9
| 155268 ||  || — || November 28, 2005 || Catalina || CSS || WIT || align=right | 1.5 km || 
|-id=269 bgcolor=#E9E9E9
| 155269 ||  || — || November 25, 2005 || Catalina || CSS || — || align=right | 2.7 km || 
|-id=270 bgcolor=#d6d6d6
| 155270 Dianawheeler ||  ||  || November 25, 2005 || Catalina || CSS || — || align=right | 4.9 km || 
|-id=271 bgcolor=#E9E9E9
| 155271 ||  || — || November 28, 2005 || Socorro || LINEAR || — || align=right | 1.7 km || 
|-id=272 bgcolor=#d6d6d6
| 155272 ||  || — || November 25, 2005 || Catalina || CSS || THM || align=right | 4.2 km || 
|-id=273 bgcolor=#E9E9E9
| 155273 ||  || — || November 28, 2005 || Catalina || CSS || HEN || align=right | 1.6 km || 
|-id=274 bgcolor=#E9E9E9
| 155274 ||  || — || November 25, 2005 || Kitt Peak || Spacewatch || — || align=right | 2.8 km || 
|-id=275 bgcolor=#fefefe
| 155275 ||  || — || November 29, 2005 || Socorro || LINEAR || SUL || align=right | 3.4 km || 
|-id=276 bgcolor=#fefefe
| 155276 ||  || — || November 29, 2005 || Palomar || NEAT || V || align=right data-sort-value="0.93" | 930 m || 
|-id=277 bgcolor=#E9E9E9
| 155277 ||  || — || November 29, 2005 || Socorro || LINEAR || PAD || align=right | 2.5 km || 
|-id=278 bgcolor=#E9E9E9
| 155278 ||  || — || November 30, 2005 || Kitt Peak || Spacewatch || — || align=right | 2.3 km || 
|-id=279 bgcolor=#E9E9E9
| 155279 ||  || — || November 30, 2005 || Mount Lemmon || Mount Lemmon Survey || — || align=right | 1.4 km || 
|-id=280 bgcolor=#d6d6d6
| 155280 ||  || — || November 25, 2005 || Catalina || CSS || — || align=right | 3.4 km || 
|-id=281 bgcolor=#E9E9E9
| 155281 ||  || — || November 29, 2005 || Socorro || LINEAR || — || align=right | 1.7 km || 
|-id=282 bgcolor=#d6d6d6
| 155282 ||  || — || November 30, 2005 || Socorro || LINEAR || — || align=right | 4.9 km || 
|-id=283 bgcolor=#d6d6d6
| 155283 ||  || — || November 29, 2005 || Catalina || CSS || — || align=right | 4.9 km || 
|-id=284 bgcolor=#E9E9E9
| 155284 ||  || — || November 20, 2005 || Catalina || CSS || MAR || align=right | 2.2 km || 
|-id=285 bgcolor=#E9E9E9
| 155285 ||  || — || November 21, 2005 || Catalina || CSS || — || align=right | 1.7 km || 
|-id=286 bgcolor=#fefefe
| 155286 ||  || — || November 26, 2005 || Socorro || LINEAR || — || align=right | 2.1 km || 
|-id=287 bgcolor=#FA8072
| 155287 ||  || — || December 4, 2005 || Socorro || LINEAR || — || align=right | 1.6 km || 
|-id=288 bgcolor=#d6d6d6
| 155288 ||  || — || December 1, 2005 || Socorro || LINEAR || — || align=right | 4.8 km || 
|-id=289 bgcolor=#d6d6d6
| 155289 ||  || — || December 4, 2005 || Socorro || LINEAR || — || align=right | 4.0 km || 
|-id=290 bgcolor=#d6d6d6
| 155290 Anniegrauer ||  ||  || December 5, 2005 || Mount Lemmon || Mount Lemmon Survey || — || align=right | 7.0 km || 
|-id=291 bgcolor=#d6d6d6
| 155291 ||  || — || December 5, 2005 || Mount Lemmon || Mount Lemmon Survey || KOR || align=right | 2.1 km || 
|-id=292 bgcolor=#E9E9E9
| 155292 ||  || — || December 7, 2005 || Socorro || LINEAR || — || align=right | 2.6 km || 
|-id=293 bgcolor=#E9E9E9
| 155293 ||  || — || December 2, 2005 || Catalina || CSS || — || align=right | 3.5 km || 
|-id=294 bgcolor=#d6d6d6
| 155294 ||  || — || December 7, 2005 || Catalina || CSS || — || align=right | 4.0 km || 
|-id=295 bgcolor=#E9E9E9
| 155295 ||  || — || December 8, 2005 || Kitt Peak || Spacewatch || MAR || align=right | 1.9 km || 
|-id=296 bgcolor=#d6d6d6
| 155296 || 2005 YJ || — || December 20, 2005 || Socorro || LINEAR || EUP || align=right | 6.9 km || 
|-id=297 bgcolor=#E9E9E9
| 155297 ||  || — || December 21, 2005 || Kitt Peak || Spacewatch || — || align=right | 2.1 km || 
|-id=298 bgcolor=#fefefe
| 155298 ||  || — || December 24, 2005 || Kitt Peak || Spacewatch || — || align=right | 1.3 km || 
|-id=299 bgcolor=#d6d6d6
| 155299 ||  || — || December 24, 2005 || Kitt Peak || Spacewatch || THM || align=right | 3.7 km || 
|-id=300 bgcolor=#d6d6d6
| 155300 ||  || — || December 22, 2005 || Kitt Peak || Spacewatch || THM || align=right | 4.5 km || 
|}

155301–155400 

|-bgcolor=#E9E9E9
| 155301 ||  || — || December 25, 2005 || Kitt Peak || Spacewatch || — || align=right | 2.9 km || 
|-id=302 bgcolor=#d6d6d6
| 155302 ||  || — || December 25, 2005 || Kitt Peak || Spacewatch || SYL7:4 || align=right | 7.9 km || 
|-id=303 bgcolor=#E9E9E9
| 155303 ||  || — || December 22, 2005 || Kitt Peak || Spacewatch || AEO || align=right | 2.0 km || 
|-id=304 bgcolor=#E9E9E9
| 155304 ||  || — || December 24, 2005 || Kitt Peak || Spacewatch || — || align=right | 1.4 km || 
|-id=305 bgcolor=#d6d6d6
| 155305 ||  || — || December 24, 2005 || Kitt Peak || Spacewatch || 7:4 || align=right | 5.0 km || 
|-id=306 bgcolor=#E9E9E9
| 155306 ||  || — || December 24, 2005 || Palomar || NEAT || EUN || align=right | 2.1 km || 
|-id=307 bgcolor=#E9E9E9
| 155307 ||  || — || December 26, 2005 || Kitt Peak || Spacewatch || — || align=right | 3.6 km || 
|-id=308 bgcolor=#d6d6d6
| 155308 ||  || — || December 26, 2005 || Mount Lemmon || Mount Lemmon Survey || — || align=right | 4.2 km || 
|-id=309 bgcolor=#d6d6d6
| 155309 ||  || — || December 28, 2005 || Mount Lemmon || Mount Lemmon Survey || — || align=right | 3.0 km || 
|-id=310 bgcolor=#d6d6d6
| 155310 ||  || — || December 26, 2005 || Mount Lemmon || Mount Lemmon Survey || — || align=right | 2.8 km || 
|-id=311 bgcolor=#E9E9E9
| 155311 ||  || — || December 27, 2005 || Kitt Peak || Spacewatch || AGN || align=right | 1.8 km || 
|-id=312 bgcolor=#d6d6d6
| 155312 ||  || — || December 28, 2005 || Kitt Peak || Spacewatch || HYG || align=right | 4.4 km || 
|-id=313 bgcolor=#d6d6d6
| 155313 ||  || — || December 29, 2005 || Kitt Peak || Spacewatch || — || align=right | 3.8 km || 
|-id=314 bgcolor=#d6d6d6
| 155314 ||  || — || December 27, 2005 || Kitt Peak || Spacewatch || — || align=right | 4.1 km || 
|-id=315 bgcolor=#d6d6d6
| 155315 ||  || — || December 31, 2005 || Socorro || LINEAR || — || align=right | 3.3 km || 
|-id=316 bgcolor=#d6d6d6
| 155316 ||  || — || December 21, 2005 || Kitt Peak || Spacewatch || THM || align=right | 3.2 km || 
|-id=317 bgcolor=#fefefe
| 155317 ||  || — || December 28, 2005 || Mount Lemmon || Mount Lemmon Survey || — || align=right | 1.2 km || 
|-id=318 bgcolor=#d6d6d6
| 155318 ||  || — || January 5, 2006 || Anderson Mesa || LONEOS || EOS || align=right | 3.8 km || 
|-id=319 bgcolor=#E9E9E9
| 155319 ||  || — || January 5, 2006 || Kitt Peak || Spacewatch || PAD || align=right | 3.4 km || 
|-id=320 bgcolor=#d6d6d6
| 155320 ||  || — || January 5, 2006 || Socorro || LINEAR || KOR || align=right | 2.5 km || 
|-id=321 bgcolor=#d6d6d6
| 155321 ||  || — || January 5, 2006 || Kitt Peak || Spacewatch || — || align=right | 4.3 km || 
|-id=322 bgcolor=#d6d6d6
| 155322 ||  || — || January 7, 2006 || Mount Lemmon || Mount Lemmon Survey || THM || align=right | 4.1 km || 
|-id=323 bgcolor=#d6d6d6
| 155323 ||  || — || January 6, 2006 || Kitt Peak || Spacewatch || KOR || align=right | 2.0 km || 
|-id=324 bgcolor=#E9E9E9
| 155324 ||  || — || January 5, 2006 || Socorro || LINEAR || HEN || align=right | 1.7 km || 
|-id=325 bgcolor=#E9E9E9
| 155325 ||  || — || January 2, 2006 || Socorro || LINEAR || MAR || align=right | 3.3 km || 
|-id=326 bgcolor=#C2FFFF
| 155326 ||  || — || January 6, 2006 || Socorro || LINEAR || L5 || align=right | 16 km || 
|-id=327 bgcolor=#C2FFFF
| 155327 ||  || — || January 6, 2006 || Mount Lemmon || Mount Lemmon Survey || L5 || align=right | 12 km || 
|-id=328 bgcolor=#E9E9E9
| 155328 ||  || — || January 22, 2006 || Mount Lemmon || Mount Lemmon Survey || — || align=right | 2.4 km || 
|-id=329 bgcolor=#E9E9E9
| 155329 ||  || — || January 23, 2006 || Kitt Peak || Spacewatch || — || align=right | 2.2 km || 
|-id=330 bgcolor=#d6d6d6
| 155330 ||  || — || January 22, 2006 || Catalina || CSS || — || align=right | 5.7 km || 
|-id=331 bgcolor=#d6d6d6
| 155331 ||  || — || January 24, 2006 || Kitt Peak || Spacewatch || — || align=right | 9.1 km || 
|-id=332 bgcolor=#C2FFFF
| 155332 ||  || — || January 25, 2006 || Kitt Peak || Spacewatch || L5 || align=right | 12 km || 
|-id=333 bgcolor=#d6d6d6
| 155333 ||  || — || January 30, 2006 || Kitt Peak || Spacewatch || — || align=right | 4.9 km || 
|-id=334 bgcolor=#FFC2E0
| 155334 ||  || — || February 27, 2006 || Kitt Peak || Spacewatch || AMO +1km || align=right | 1.3 km || 
|-id=335 bgcolor=#d6d6d6
| 155335 || 2006 EV || — || March 4, 2006 || Mount Lemmon || Mount Lemmon Survey || EUP || align=right | 7.9 km || 
|-id=336 bgcolor=#FFC2E0
| 155336 ||  || — || April 2, 2006 || Kitt Peak || Spacewatch || APOcritical || align=right data-sort-value="0.78" | 780 m || 
|-id=337 bgcolor=#C2FFFF
| 155337 ||  || — || May 29, 2006 || Mount Lemmon || Mount Lemmon Survey || L5 || align=right | 17 km || 
|-id=338 bgcolor=#FFC2E0
| 155338 ||  || — || June 20, 2006 || Catalina || CSS || APOPHAcritical || align=right data-sort-value="0.28" | 280 m || 
|-id=339 bgcolor=#fefefe
| 155339 ||  || — || September 15, 2006 || Kitt Peak || Spacewatch || SUL || align=right | 2.2 km || 
|-id=340 bgcolor=#FFC2E0
| 155340 ||  || — || September 28, 2006 || Catalina || CSS || AMO +1km || align=right | 1.8 km || 
|-id=341 bgcolor=#FFC2E0
| 155341 ||  || — || September 30, 2006 || Siding Spring || SSS || AMO +1km || align=right data-sort-value="0.78" | 780 m || 
|-id=342 bgcolor=#d6d6d6
| 155342 ||  || — || December 12, 2006 || Mount Lemmon || Mount Lemmon Survey || — || align=right | 3.6 km || 
|-id=343 bgcolor=#E9E9E9
| 155343 ||  || — || December 20, 2006 || Palomar || NEAT || — || align=right | 3.6 km || 
|-id=344 bgcolor=#fefefe
| 155344 ||  || — || January 9, 2007 || Kitt Peak || Spacewatch || NYS || align=right | 1.2 km || 
|-id=345 bgcolor=#fefefe
| 155345 ||  || — || January 9, 2007 || Mount Lemmon || Mount Lemmon Survey || FLO || align=right | 1.5 km || 
|-id=346 bgcolor=#fefefe
| 155346 ||  || — || January 10, 2007 || Mount Lemmon || Mount Lemmon Survey || — || align=right data-sort-value="0.98" | 980 m || 
|-id=347 bgcolor=#E9E9E9
| 155347 ||  || — || January 23, 2007 || Anderson Mesa || LONEOS || — || align=right | 2.4 km || 
|-id=348 bgcolor=#fefefe
| 155348 ||  || — || January 24, 2007 || Catalina || CSS || MAS || align=right | 1.3 km || 
|-id=349 bgcolor=#fefefe
| 155349 ||  || — || February 8, 2007 || Mount Lemmon || Mount Lemmon Survey || NYS || align=right data-sort-value="0.98" | 980 m || 
|-id=350 bgcolor=#E9E9E9
| 155350 ||  || — || February 6, 2007 || Palomar || NEAT || MAR || align=right | 1.9 km || 
|-id=351 bgcolor=#E9E9E9
| 155351 ||  || — || February 8, 2007 || Catalina || CSS || MAR || align=right | 1.8 km || 
|-id=352 bgcolor=#fefefe
| 155352 ||  || — || February 8, 2007 || Catalina || CSS || KLI || align=right | 3.0 km || 
|-id=353 bgcolor=#fefefe
| 155353 ||  || — || February 8, 2007 || Kitt Peak || Spacewatch || NYS || align=right | 1.1 km || 
|-id=354 bgcolor=#d6d6d6
| 155354 ||  || — || February 9, 2007 || Kitt Peak || Spacewatch || TIR || align=right | 4.4 km || 
|-id=355 bgcolor=#fefefe
| 155355 ||  || — || February 16, 2007 || Catalina || CSS || MAS || align=right | 1.1 km || 
|-id=356 bgcolor=#E9E9E9
| 155356 || 2707 P-L || — || September 24, 1960 || Palomar || PLS || MRX || align=right | 1.6 km || 
|-id=357 bgcolor=#E9E9E9
| 155357 || 6096 P-L || — || September 24, 1960 || Palomar || PLS || ADE || align=right | 3.9 km || 
|-id=358 bgcolor=#d6d6d6
| 155358 || 6231 P-L || — || September 24, 1960 || Palomar || PLS || EOS || align=right | 3.7 km || 
|-id=359 bgcolor=#fefefe
| 155359 || 6292 P-L || — || September 24, 1960 || Palomar || PLS || V || align=right | 1.7 km || 
|-id=360 bgcolor=#fefefe
| 155360 || 1031 T-2 || — || September 29, 1973 || Palomar || PLS || V || align=right | 1.1 km || 
|-id=361 bgcolor=#d6d6d6
| 155361 || 1096 T-2 || — || September 29, 1973 || Palomar || PLS || — || align=right | 6.9 km || 
|-id=362 bgcolor=#fefefe
| 155362 || 3127 T-3 || — || October 16, 1977 || Palomar || PLS || — || align=right | 1.5 km || 
|-id=363 bgcolor=#E9E9E9
| 155363 || 3207 T-3 || — || October 16, 1977 || Palomar || PLS || — || align=right | 3.5 km || 
|-id=364 bgcolor=#E9E9E9
| 155364 || 3402 T-3 || — || October 16, 1977 || Palomar || PLS || XIZ || align=right | 2.2 km || 
|-id=365 bgcolor=#E9E9E9
| 155365 || 4308 T-3 || — || October 16, 1977 || Palomar || PLS || NEM || align=right | 3.2 km || 
|-id=366 bgcolor=#E9E9E9
| 155366 || 4557 T-3 || — || October 16, 1977 || Palomar || PLS || — || align=right | 1.6 km || 
|-id=367 bgcolor=#E9E9E9
| 155367 || 5095 T-3 || — || October 16, 1977 || Palomar || PLS || — || align=right | 3.9 km || 
|-id=368 bgcolor=#d6d6d6
| 155368 || 5120 T-3 || — || October 16, 1977 || Palomar || PLS || EUP || align=right | 7.6 km || 
|-id=369 bgcolor=#fefefe
| 155369 ||  || — || March 1, 1981 || Siding Spring || S. J. Bus || — || align=right | 1.4 km || 
|-id=370 bgcolor=#FA8072
| 155370 || 1988 TX || — || October 13, 1988 || Kushiro || S. Ueda, H. Kaneda || — || align=right | 1.6 km || 
|-id=371 bgcolor=#fefefe
| 155371 ||  || — || September 22, 1990 || La Silla || E. W. Elst || NYS || align=right | 1.0 km || 
|-id=372 bgcolor=#E9E9E9
| 155372 ||  || — || October 6, 1991 || Palomar || A. Lowe || — || align=right | 3.3 km || 
|-id=373 bgcolor=#fefefe
| 155373 ||  || — || October 7, 1991 || Palomar || A. Lowe || NYS || align=right | 2.2 km || 
|-id=374 bgcolor=#E9E9E9
| 155374 ||  || — || November 5, 1991 || Kitt Peak || Spacewatch || — || align=right | 4.1 km || 
|-id=375 bgcolor=#fefefe
| 155375 ||  || — || February 26, 1992 || Kitt Peak || Spacewatch || MAS || align=right data-sort-value="0.92" | 920 m || 
|-id=376 bgcolor=#E9E9E9
| 155376 ||  || — || September 2, 1992 || La Silla || E. W. Elst || — || align=right | 2.3 km || 
|-id=377 bgcolor=#E9E9E9
| 155377 ||  || — || September 27, 1992 || Kitt Peak || Spacewatch || — || align=right | 2.7 km || 
|-id=378 bgcolor=#E9E9E9
| 155378 ||  || — || March 17, 1993 || La Silla || UESAC || — || align=right | 2.3 km || 
|-id=379 bgcolor=#fefefe
| 155379 ||  || — || March 19, 1993 || La Silla || UESAC || NYS || align=right data-sort-value="0.96" | 960 m || 
|-id=380 bgcolor=#fefefe
| 155380 ||  || — || March 17, 1993 || La Silla || UESAC || — || align=right | 1.2 km || 
|-id=381 bgcolor=#E9E9E9
| 155381 ||  || — || March 21, 1993 || La Silla || UESAC || HOF || align=right | 4.1 km || 
|-id=382 bgcolor=#d6d6d6
| 155382 ||  || — || October 9, 1993 || La Silla || E. W. Elst || — || align=right | 3.6 km || 
|-id=383 bgcolor=#fefefe
| 155383 ||  || — || October 9, 1993 || La Silla || E. W. Elst || EUT || align=right | 1.0 km || 
|-id=384 bgcolor=#fefefe
| 155384 ||  || — || October 9, 1993 || La Silla || E. W. Elst || NYS || align=right | 1.4 km || 
|-id=385 bgcolor=#fefefe
| 155385 ||  || — || October 20, 1993 || La Silla || E. W. Elst || — || align=right | 1.3 km || 
|-id=386 bgcolor=#E9E9E9
| 155386 ||  || — || January 7, 1994 || Kitt Peak || Spacewatch || — || align=right | 1.4 km || 
|-id=387 bgcolor=#d6d6d6
| 155387 ||  || — || January 8, 1994 || Kitt Peak || Spacewatch || THM || align=right | 3.7 km || 
|-id=388 bgcolor=#E9E9E9
| 155388 ||  || — || January 8, 1994 || Kitt Peak || Spacewatch || — || align=right | 1.9 km || 
|-id=389 bgcolor=#E9E9E9
| 155389 ||  || — || February 10, 1994 || Kitt Peak || Spacewatch || — || align=right | 1.9 km || 
|-id=390 bgcolor=#FA8072
| 155390 ||  || — || August 12, 1994 || La Silla || E. W. Elst || — || align=right | 1.3 km || 
|-id=391 bgcolor=#fefefe
| 155391 ||  || — || August 12, 1994 || La Silla || E. W. Elst || — || align=right | 1.4 km || 
|-id=392 bgcolor=#d6d6d6
| 155392 ||  || — || September 28, 1994 || Kitt Peak || Spacewatch || KOR || align=right | 1.4 km || 
|-id=393 bgcolor=#fefefe
| 155393 ||  || — || January 23, 1995 || Kitt Peak || Spacewatch || NYS || align=right | 1.0 km || 
|-id=394 bgcolor=#d6d6d6
| 155394 ||  || — || February 1, 1995 || Kitt Peak || Spacewatch || — || align=right | 3.7 km || 
|-id=395 bgcolor=#d6d6d6
| 155395 ||  || — || September 25, 1995 || Ondřejov || L. Kotková || BRA || align=right | 2.4 km || 
|-id=396 bgcolor=#E9E9E9
| 155396 ||  || — || September 18, 1995 || Kitt Peak || Spacewatch || — || align=right | 2.3 km || 
|-id=397 bgcolor=#E9E9E9
| 155397 ||  || — || September 18, 1995 || Kitt Peak || Spacewatch || — || align=right | 2.9 km || 
|-id=398 bgcolor=#E9E9E9
| 155398 ||  || — || September 21, 1995 || Kitt Peak || Spacewatch || — || align=right | 2.4 km || 
|-id=399 bgcolor=#fefefe
| 155399 ||  || — || September 26, 1995 || Kitt Peak || Spacewatch || V || align=right | 1.1 km || 
|-id=400 bgcolor=#fefefe
| 155400 ||  || — || October 21, 1995 || Kleť || Kleť Obs. || — || align=right | 1.0 km || 
|}

155401–155500 

|-bgcolor=#E9E9E9
| 155401 ||  || — || October 17, 1995 || Kitt Peak || Spacewatch || — || align=right | 3.2 km || 
|-id=402 bgcolor=#E9E9E9
| 155402 ||  || — || October 18, 1995 || Kitt Peak || Spacewatch || — || align=right | 2.9 km || 
|-id=403 bgcolor=#E9E9E9
| 155403 ||  || — || October 19, 1995 || Kitt Peak || Spacewatch || — || align=right | 1.8 km || 
|-id=404 bgcolor=#E9E9E9
| 155404 ||  || — || October 22, 1995 || Kitt Peak || Spacewatch || — || align=right | 3.3 km || 
|-id=405 bgcolor=#d6d6d6
| 155405 ||  || — || November 14, 1995 || Kitt Peak || Spacewatch || KOR || align=right | 2.0 km || 
|-id=406 bgcolor=#fefefe
| 155406 ||  || — || November 15, 1995 || Kitt Peak || Spacewatch || — || align=right | 1.9 km || 
|-id=407 bgcolor=#E9E9E9
| 155407 ||  || — || December 14, 1995 || Kitt Peak || Spacewatch || GEF || align=right | 1.8 km || 
|-id=408 bgcolor=#E9E9E9
| 155408 ||  || — || December 16, 1995 || Kitt Peak || Spacewatch || — || align=right | 2.2 km || 
|-id=409 bgcolor=#E9E9E9
| 155409 ||  || — || December 16, 1995 || Kitt Peak || Spacewatch || — || align=right | 3.6 km || 
|-id=410 bgcolor=#fefefe
| 155410 ||  || — || February 15, 1996 || Sormano || P. Sicoli, P. Ghezzi || — || align=right | 1.9 km || 
|-id=411 bgcolor=#fefefe
| 155411 ||  || — || February 28, 1996 || Cloudcroft || W. Offutt || V || align=right data-sort-value="0.87" | 870 m || 
|-id=412 bgcolor=#fefefe
| 155412 ||  || — || March 20, 1996 || Kitt Peak || Spacewatch || — || align=right | 1.9 km || 
|-id=413 bgcolor=#d6d6d6
| 155413 ||  || — || April 18, 1996 || La Silla || E. W. Elst || — || align=right | 5.8 km || 
|-id=414 bgcolor=#fefefe
| 155414 ||  || — || April 20, 1996 || La Silla || E. W. Elst || — || align=right | 1.3 km || 
|-id=415 bgcolor=#C2FFFF
| 155415 ||  || — || May 11, 1996 || Kitt Peak || Spacewatch || L5 || align=right | 11 km || 
|-id=416 bgcolor=#d6d6d6
| 155416 ||  || — || May 17, 1996 || Kitt Peak || Spacewatch || — || align=right | 4.7 km || 
|-id=417 bgcolor=#E9E9E9
| 155417 ||  || — || September 5, 1996 || Kitt Peak || Spacewatch || RAF || align=right | 1.7 km || 
|-id=418 bgcolor=#E9E9E9
| 155418 ||  || — || September 19, 1996 || Kitt Peak || Spacewatch || — || align=right | 1.2 km || 
|-id=419 bgcolor=#E9E9E9
| 155419 ||  || — || October 10, 1996 || Kitt Peak || Spacewatch || — || align=right | 1.5 km || 
|-id=420 bgcolor=#E9E9E9
| 155420 ||  || — || November 4, 1996 || Kitt Peak || Spacewatch || EUN || align=right | 2.6 km || 
|-id=421 bgcolor=#E9E9E9
| 155421 ||  || — || November 9, 1996 || Kitt Peak || Spacewatch || EUN || align=right | 1.5 km || 
|-id=422 bgcolor=#E9E9E9
| 155422 ||  || — || December 4, 1996 || Kitt Peak || Spacewatch || — || align=right | 2.4 km || 
|-id=423 bgcolor=#E9E9E9
| 155423 ||  || — || January 10, 1997 || Kitt Peak || Spacewatch || — || align=right | 2.6 km || 
|-id=424 bgcolor=#E9E9E9
| 155424 ||  || — || January 31, 1997 || Kitt Peak || Spacewatch || WIT || align=right | 1.8 km || 
|-id=425 bgcolor=#E9E9E9
| 155425 ||  || — || March 3, 1997 || Kitt Peak || Spacewatch || — || align=right | 3.5 km || 
|-id=426 bgcolor=#fefefe
| 155426 ||  || — || April 3, 1997 || Socorro || LINEAR || — || align=right | 1.1 km || 
|-id=427 bgcolor=#C2FFFF
| 155427 ||  || — || June 1, 1997 || Kitt Peak || Spacewatch || L5 || align=right | 9.9 km || 
|-id=428 bgcolor=#d6d6d6
| 155428 ||  || — || June 28, 1997 || Socorro || LINEAR || — || align=right | 6.8 km || 
|-id=429 bgcolor=#fefefe
| 155429 ||  || — || June 29, 1997 || Kitt Peak || Spacewatch || NYS || align=right | 2.8 km || 
|-id=430 bgcolor=#fefefe
| 155430 ||  || — || July 7, 1997 || Kitt Peak || Spacewatch || NYS || align=right data-sort-value="0.98" | 980 m || 
|-id=431 bgcolor=#d6d6d6
| 155431 ||  || — || August 30, 1997 || Haleakala || NEAT || — || align=right | 6.8 km || 
|-id=432 bgcolor=#fefefe
| 155432 ||  || — || September 25, 1997 || Ondřejov || M. Wolf, P. Pravec || NYS || align=right data-sort-value="0.99" | 990 m || 
|-id=433 bgcolor=#fefefe
| 155433 ||  || — || October 18, 1997 || Xinglong || SCAP || NYS || align=right | 1.6 km || 
|-id=434 bgcolor=#fefefe
| 155434 ||  || — || November 3, 1997 || Xinglong || SCAP || — || align=right | 1.6 km || 
|-id=435 bgcolor=#fefefe
| 155435 ||  || — || November 23, 1997 || Kitt Peak || Spacewatch || — || align=right | 1.7 km || 
|-id=436 bgcolor=#fefefe
| 155436 ||  || — || November 28, 1997 || Kitt Peak || Spacewatch || V || align=right | 1.1 km || 
|-id=437 bgcolor=#E9E9E9
| 155437 || 1998 DE || — || February 17, 1998 || Bédoin || P. Antonini || — || align=right | 2.9 km || 
|-id=438 bgcolor=#E9E9E9
| 155438 Velásquez || 1998 DV ||  || February 18, 1998 || Kleť || Kleť Obs. || — || align=right | 2.3 km || 
|-id=439 bgcolor=#E9E9E9
| 155439 ||  || — || February 21, 1998 || Kitt Peak || Spacewatch || — || align=right | 3.6 km || 
|-id=440 bgcolor=#E9E9E9
| 155440 ||  || — || March 21, 1998 || Kitt Peak || Spacewatch || — || align=right | 2.0 km || 
|-id=441 bgcolor=#E9E9E9
| 155441 ||  || — || March 24, 1998 || Caussols || ODAS || — || align=right | 3.2 km || 
|-id=442 bgcolor=#E9E9E9
| 155442 ||  || — || April 18, 1998 || Kitt Peak || Spacewatch || GEF || align=right | 2.1 km || 
|-id=443 bgcolor=#E9E9E9
| 155443 ||  || — || April 17, 1998 || Kitt Peak || Spacewatch || HEN || align=right | 1.6 km || 
|-id=444 bgcolor=#E9E9E9
| 155444 ||  || — || April 20, 1998 || Socorro || LINEAR || VIB || align=right | 3.9 km || 
|-id=445 bgcolor=#E9E9E9
| 155445 ||  || — || April 20, 1998 || Socorro || LINEAR || — || align=right | 3.9 km || 
|-id=446 bgcolor=#E9E9E9
| 155446 ||  || — || April 20, 1998 || Socorro || LINEAR || — || align=right | 4.3 km || 
|-id=447 bgcolor=#E9E9E9
| 155447 ||  || — || April 19, 1998 || Kitt Peak || Spacewatch || — || align=right | 3.8 km || 
|-id=448 bgcolor=#E9E9E9
| 155448 ||  || — || April 24, 1998 || Kitt Peak || Spacewatch || — || align=right | 3.2 km || 
|-id=449 bgcolor=#E9E9E9
| 155449 ||  || — || April 21, 1998 || Socorro || LINEAR || — || align=right | 4.5 km || 
|-id=450 bgcolor=#E9E9E9
| 155450 ||  || — || April 23, 1998 || Socorro || LINEAR || — || align=right | 3.4 km || 
|-id=451 bgcolor=#E9E9E9
| 155451 ||  || — || April 19, 1998 || Socorro || LINEAR || EUN || align=right | 2.9 km || 
|-id=452 bgcolor=#E9E9E9
| 155452 ||  || — || April 20, 1998 || Socorro || LINEAR || — || align=right | 3.0 km || 
|-id=453 bgcolor=#E9E9E9
| 155453 ||  || — || April 19, 1998 || Socorro || LINEAR || — || align=right | 3.8 km || 
|-id=454 bgcolor=#E9E9E9
| 155454 ||  || — || June 19, 1998 || Caussols || ODAS || PAE || align=right | 4.8 km || 
|-id=455 bgcolor=#FA8072
| 155455 ||  || — || June 29, 1998 || Kitt Peak || Spacewatch || — || align=right | 1.3 km || 
|-id=456 bgcolor=#fefefe
| 155456 ||  || — || August 27, 1998 || Xinglong || SCAP || — || align=right | 1.6 km || 
|-id=457 bgcolor=#fefefe
| 155457 ||  || — || August 26, 1998 || La Silla || E. W. Elst || — || align=right | 3.3 km || 
|-id=458 bgcolor=#fefefe
| 155458 ||  || — || August 17, 1998 || Socorro || LINEAR || — || align=right | 1.0 km || 
|-id=459 bgcolor=#d6d6d6
| 155459 ||  || — || September 12, 1998 || Kitt Peak || Spacewatch || — || align=right | 5.2 km || 
|-id=460 bgcolor=#d6d6d6
| 155460 ||  || — || September 14, 1998 || Kitt Peak || Spacewatch || — || align=right | 4.1 km || 
|-id=461 bgcolor=#fefefe
| 155461 ||  || — || September 14, 1998 || Socorro || LINEAR || — || align=right | 3.8 km || 
|-id=462 bgcolor=#fefefe
| 155462 ||  || — || September 14, 1998 || Socorro || LINEAR || FLO || align=right | 1.0 km || 
|-id=463 bgcolor=#d6d6d6
| 155463 ||  || — || September 14, 1998 || Socorro || LINEAR || VER || align=right | 5.0 km || 
|-id=464 bgcolor=#fefefe
| 155464 ||  || — || September 14, 1998 || Socorro || LINEAR || — || align=right | 1.3 km || 
|-id=465 bgcolor=#d6d6d6
| 155465 ||  || — || September 14, 1998 || Socorro || LINEAR || — || align=right | 6.0 km || 
|-id=466 bgcolor=#fefefe
| 155466 ||  || — || September 17, 1998 || Xinglong || SCAP || — || align=right | 1.4 km || 
|-id=467 bgcolor=#fefefe
| 155467 ||  || — || September 21, 1998 || Kitt Peak || Spacewatch || — || align=right | 1.4 km || 
|-id=468 bgcolor=#fefefe
| 155468 ||  || — || September 20, 1998 || La Silla || E. W. Elst || FLO || align=right | 1.0 km || 
|-id=469 bgcolor=#d6d6d6
| 155469 ||  || — || September 26, 1998 || Socorro || LINEAR || EOS || align=right | 3.9 km || 
|-id=470 bgcolor=#fefefe
| 155470 ||  || — || September 26, 1998 || Socorro || LINEAR || — || align=right | 1.2 km || 
|-id=471 bgcolor=#d6d6d6
| 155471 ||  || — || September 26, 1998 || Socorro || LINEAR || — || align=right | 4.5 km || 
|-id=472 bgcolor=#d6d6d6
| 155472 ||  || — || September 26, 1998 || Socorro || LINEAR || — || align=right | 5.6 km || 
|-id=473 bgcolor=#fefefe
| 155473 ||  || — || September 26, 1998 || Socorro || LINEAR || FLO || align=right data-sort-value="0.98" | 980 m || 
|-id=474 bgcolor=#d6d6d6
| 155474 ||  || — || September 26, 1998 || Socorro || LINEAR || — || align=right | 4.0 km || 
|-id=475 bgcolor=#d6d6d6
| 155475 ||  || — || September 26, 1998 || Socorro || LINEAR || — || align=right | 5.4 km || 
|-id=476 bgcolor=#d6d6d6
| 155476 ||  || — || September 26, 1998 || Socorro || LINEAR || — || align=right | 4.4 km || 
|-id=477 bgcolor=#d6d6d6
| 155477 ||  || — || September 26, 1998 || Socorro || LINEAR || — || align=right | 4.4 km || 
|-id=478 bgcolor=#fefefe
| 155478 ||  || — || September 26, 1998 || Socorro || LINEAR || — || align=right | 2.6 km || 
|-id=479 bgcolor=#fefefe
| 155479 ||  || — || October 13, 1998 || Caussols || ODAS || — || align=right | 1.2 km || 
|-id=480 bgcolor=#fefefe
| 155480 ||  || — || October 13, 1998 || Caussols || ODAS || — || align=right | 2.8 km || 
|-id=481 bgcolor=#fefefe
| 155481 ||  || — || October 14, 1998 || Kitt Peak || Spacewatch || — || align=right | 1.1 km || 
|-id=482 bgcolor=#d6d6d6
| 155482 ||  || — || October 10, 1998 || Anderson Mesa || LONEOS || — || align=right | 6.3 km || 
|-id=483 bgcolor=#d6d6d6
| 155483 ||  || — || October 18, 1998 || La Silla || E. W. Elst || — || align=right | 5.0 km || 
|-id=484 bgcolor=#d6d6d6
| 155484 ||  || — || October 28, 1998 || Socorro || LINEAR || HYG || align=right | 5.5 km || 
|-id=485 bgcolor=#fefefe
| 155485 ||  || — || November 10, 1998 || Socorro || LINEAR || — || align=right | 1.3 km || 
|-id=486 bgcolor=#fefefe
| 155486 ||  || — || November 11, 1998 || Anderson Mesa || LONEOS || — || align=right | 1.4 km || 
|-id=487 bgcolor=#fefefe
| 155487 ||  || — || November 27, 1998 || Cocoa || I. P. Griffin || V || align=right | 1.1 km || 
|-id=488 bgcolor=#d6d6d6
| 155488 ||  || — || November 18, 1998 || Kitt Peak || Spacewatch || — || align=right | 4.4 km || 
|-id=489 bgcolor=#d6d6d6
| 155489 ||  || — || December 9, 1998 || Kitt Peak || Spacewatch || THM || align=right | 3.6 km || 
|-id=490 bgcolor=#fefefe
| 155490 ||  || — || December 15, 1998 || Socorro || LINEAR || PHO || align=right | 2.2 km || 
|-id=491 bgcolor=#fefefe
| 155491 ||  || — || December 24, 1998 || Catalina || CSS || H || align=right | 1.4 km || 
|-id=492 bgcolor=#fefefe
| 155492 ||  || — || January 8, 1999 || Kitt Peak || Spacewatch || — || align=right | 1.2 km || 
|-id=493 bgcolor=#fefefe
| 155493 ||  || — || January 16, 1999 || Kitt Peak || Spacewatch || NYS || align=right | 4.0 km || 
|-id=494 bgcolor=#E9E9E9
| 155494 ||  || — || February 10, 1999 || Socorro || LINEAR || — || align=right | 3.6 km || 
|-id=495 bgcolor=#E9E9E9
| 155495 ||  || — || February 10, 1999 || Socorro || LINEAR || — || align=right | 1.4 km || 
|-id=496 bgcolor=#fefefe
| 155496 ||  || — || February 10, 1999 || Socorro || LINEAR || — || align=right | 1.9 km || 
|-id=497 bgcolor=#fefefe
| 155497 ||  || — || February 10, 1999 || Socorro || LINEAR || — || align=right | 1.0 km || 
|-id=498 bgcolor=#E9E9E9
| 155498 ||  || — || February 12, 1999 || Socorro || LINEAR || — || align=right | 2.0 km || 
|-id=499 bgcolor=#fefefe
| 155499 ||  || — || March 14, 1999 || Kitt Peak || Spacewatch || MAS || align=right data-sort-value="0.87" | 870 m || 
|-id=500 bgcolor=#E9E9E9
| 155500 ||  || — || March 15, 1999 || Socorro || LINEAR || — || align=right | 3.1 km || 
|}

155501–155600 

|-bgcolor=#E9E9E9
| 155501 ||  || — || May 12, 1999 || Socorro || LINEAR || — || align=right | 4.7 km || 
|-id=502 bgcolor=#E9E9E9
| 155502 ||  || — || May 12, 1999 || Socorro || LINEAR || — || align=right | 3.0 km || 
|-id=503 bgcolor=#fefefe
| 155503 ||  || — || June 11, 1999 || Socorro || LINEAR || H || align=right data-sort-value="0.84" | 840 m || 
|-id=504 bgcolor=#E9E9E9
| 155504 ||  || — || June 9, 1999 || Kitt Peak || Spacewatch || EUN || align=right | 2.0 km || 
|-id=505 bgcolor=#E9E9E9
| 155505 ||  || — || July 14, 1999 || Socorro || LINEAR || — || align=right | 3.5 km || 
|-id=506 bgcolor=#E9E9E9
| 155506 ||  || — || July 14, 1999 || Socorro || LINEAR || — || align=right | 3.2 km || 
|-id=507 bgcolor=#d6d6d6
| 155507 ||  || — || September 3, 1999 || Kitt Peak || Spacewatch || — || align=right | 2.7 km || 
|-id=508 bgcolor=#d6d6d6
| 155508 ||  || — || September 7, 1999 || Socorro || LINEAR || — || align=right | 3.6 km || 
|-id=509 bgcolor=#E9E9E9
| 155509 ||  || — || September 7, 1999 || Socorro || LINEAR || WIT || align=right | 2.0 km || 
|-id=510 bgcolor=#d6d6d6
| 155510 ||  || — || September 7, 1999 || Socorro || LINEAR || EOS || align=right | 2.9 km || 
|-id=511 bgcolor=#E9E9E9
| 155511 ||  || — || September 9, 1999 || Socorro || LINEAR || NEM || align=right | 3.6 km || 
|-id=512 bgcolor=#E9E9E9
| 155512 ||  || — || September 9, 1999 || Socorro || LINEAR || WIT || align=right | 2.1 km || 
|-id=513 bgcolor=#E9E9E9
| 155513 ||  || — || September 9, 1999 || Socorro || LINEAR || — || align=right | 4.1 km || 
|-id=514 bgcolor=#E9E9E9
| 155514 ||  || — || September 9, 1999 || Socorro || LINEAR || — || align=right | 4.3 km || 
|-id=515 bgcolor=#E9E9E9
| 155515 ||  || — || September 10, 1999 || Socorro || LINEAR || — || align=right | 2.7 km || 
|-id=516 bgcolor=#d6d6d6
| 155516 ||  || — || September 8, 1999 || Socorro || LINEAR || FIR || align=right | 5.2 km || 
|-id=517 bgcolor=#d6d6d6
| 155517 ||  || — || September 12, 1999 || Bergisch Gladbach || W. Bickel || KOR || align=right | 1.6 km || 
|-id=518 bgcolor=#d6d6d6
| 155518 ||  || — || September 3, 1999 || Kitt Peak || Spacewatch || — || align=right | 3.3 km || 
|-id=519 bgcolor=#E9E9E9
| 155519 ||  || — || September 8, 1999 || Kitt Peak || Spacewatch || — || align=right | 3.3 km || 
|-id=520 bgcolor=#d6d6d6
| 155520 ||  || — || October 8, 1999 || Prescott || P. G. Comba || — || align=right | 7.7 km || 
|-id=521 bgcolor=#fefefe
| 155521 ||  || — || October 3, 1999 || Socorro || LINEAR || — || align=right | 1.0 km || 
|-id=522 bgcolor=#E9E9E9
| 155522 ||  || — || October 3, 1999 || Socorro || LINEAR || — || align=right | 4.8 km || 
|-id=523 bgcolor=#E9E9E9
| 155523 ||  || — || October 11, 1999 || Anderson Mesa || LONEOS || — || align=right | 4.1 km || 
|-id=524 bgcolor=#d6d6d6
| 155524 ||  || — || October 6, 1999 || Kitt Peak || Spacewatch || — || align=right | 3.1 km || 
|-id=525 bgcolor=#d6d6d6
| 155525 ||  || — || October 7, 1999 || Kitt Peak || Spacewatch || — || align=right | 3.9 km || 
|-id=526 bgcolor=#d6d6d6
| 155526 ||  || — || October 8, 1999 || Kitt Peak || Spacewatch || CHA || align=right | 2.2 km || 
|-id=527 bgcolor=#d6d6d6
| 155527 ||  || — || October 9, 1999 || Kitt Peak || Spacewatch || KOR || align=right | 2.1 km || 
|-id=528 bgcolor=#d6d6d6
| 155528 ||  || — || October 14, 1999 || Kitt Peak || Spacewatch || EOS || align=right | 3.0 km || 
|-id=529 bgcolor=#d6d6d6
| 155529 ||  || — || October 4, 1999 || Socorro || LINEAR || — || align=right | 6.6 km || 
|-id=530 bgcolor=#d6d6d6
| 155530 ||  || — || October 15, 1999 || Socorro || LINEAR || TEL || align=right | 2.2 km || 
|-id=531 bgcolor=#d6d6d6
| 155531 ||  || — || October 6, 1999 || Socorro || LINEAR || KAR || align=right | 2.0 km || 
|-id=532 bgcolor=#E9E9E9
| 155532 ||  || — || October 6, 1999 || Socorro || LINEAR || — || align=right | 3.4 km || 
|-id=533 bgcolor=#d6d6d6
| 155533 ||  || — || October 6, 1999 || Socorro || LINEAR || EOS || align=right | 2.6 km || 
|-id=534 bgcolor=#d6d6d6
| 155534 ||  || — || October 7, 1999 || Socorro || LINEAR || — || align=right | 3.9 km || 
|-id=535 bgcolor=#E9E9E9
| 155535 ||  || — || October 10, 1999 || Socorro || LINEAR || — || align=right | 2.6 km || 
|-id=536 bgcolor=#d6d6d6
| 155536 ||  || — || October 12, 1999 || Socorro || LINEAR || LIX || align=right | 5.0 km || 
|-id=537 bgcolor=#d6d6d6
| 155537 ||  || — || October 13, 1999 || Socorro || LINEAR || — || align=right | 5.0 km || 
|-id=538 bgcolor=#fefefe
| 155538 ||  || — || October 14, 1999 || Socorro || LINEAR || — || align=right | 1.9 km || 
|-id=539 bgcolor=#E9E9E9
| 155539 ||  || — || October 1, 1999 || Catalina || CSS || JUN || align=right | 1.7 km || 
|-id=540 bgcolor=#d6d6d6
| 155540 ||  || — || October 1, 1999 || Catalina || CSS || KOR || align=right | 2.1 km || 
|-id=541 bgcolor=#E9E9E9
| 155541 ||  || — || October 9, 1999 || Catalina || CSS || GEF || align=right | 2.5 km || 
|-id=542 bgcolor=#d6d6d6
| 155542 ||  || — || October 10, 1999 || Kitt Peak || Spacewatch || KOR || align=right | 2.3 km || 
|-id=543 bgcolor=#d6d6d6
| 155543 ||  || — || October 15, 1999 || Kitt Peak || Spacewatch || — || align=right | 3.4 km || 
|-id=544 bgcolor=#d6d6d6
| 155544 ||  || — || October 9, 1999 || Socorro || LINEAR || — || align=right | 4.8 km || 
|-id=545 bgcolor=#d6d6d6
| 155545 ||  || — || October 6, 1999 || Socorro || LINEAR || — || align=right | 2.8 km || 
|-id=546 bgcolor=#E9E9E9
| 155546 ||  || — || October 4, 1999 || Kitt Peak || Spacewatch || — || align=right | 2.2 km || 
|-id=547 bgcolor=#d6d6d6
| 155547 ||  || — || October 29, 1999 || Catalina || CSS || 628 || align=right | 3.9 km || 
|-id=548 bgcolor=#d6d6d6
| 155548 ||  || — || October 31, 1999 || Kitt Peak || Spacewatch || KOR || align=right | 1.6 km || 
|-id=549 bgcolor=#d6d6d6
| 155549 ||  || — || October 31, 1999 || Kitt Peak || Spacewatch || — || align=right | 2.9 km || 
|-id=550 bgcolor=#d6d6d6
| 155550 ||  || — || October 31, 1999 || Kitt Peak || Spacewatch || — || align=right | 3.0 km || 
|-id=551 bgcolor=#d6d6d6
| 155551 ||  || — || October 29, 1999 || Catalina || CSS || — || align=right | 3.8 km || 
|-id=552 bgcolor=#d6d6d6
| 155552 ||  || — || October 30, 1999 || Catalina || CSS || — || align=right | 3.6 km || 
|-id=553 bgcolor=#d6d6d6
| 155553 ||  || — || October 29, 1999 || Kitt Peak || Spacewatch || EOS || align=right | 2.2 km || 
|-id=554 bgcolor=#d6d6d6
| 155554 ||  || — || November 4, 1999 || Socorro || LINEAR || — || align=right | 5.4 km || 
|-id=555 bgcolor=#E9E9E9
| 155555 ||  || — || November 4, 1999 || Socorro || LINEAR || — || align=right | 4.9 km || 
|-id=556 bgcolor=#d6d6d6
| 155556 ||  || — || November 4, 1999 || Socorro || LINEAR || — || align=right | 5.7 km || 
|-id=557 bgcolor=#d6d6d6
| 155557 ||  || — || November 9, 1999 || Socorro || LINEAR || — || align=right | 4.7 km || 
|-id=558 bgcolor=#d6d6d6
| 155558 ||  || — || November 9, 1999 || Kitt Peak || Spacewatch || — || align=right | 3.4 km || 
|-id=559 bgcolor=#d6d6d6
| 155559 ||  || — || November 12, 1999 || Socorro || LINEAR || THM || align=right | 3.1 km || 
|-id=560 bgcolor=#d6d6d6
| 155560 ||  || — || November 14, 1999 || Socorro || LINEAR || — || align=right | 4.7 km || 
|-id=561 bgcolor=#d6d6d6
| 155561 ||  || — || November 14, 1999 || Socorro || LINEAR || — || align=right | 6.2 km || 
|-id=562 bgcolor=#d6d6d6
| 155562 ||  || — || November 9, 1999 || Socorro || LINEAR || — || align=right | 5.5 km || 
|-id=563 bgcolor=#d6d6d6
| 155563 ||  || — || November 3, 1999 || Catalina || CSS || EOS || align=right | 4.5 km || 
|-id=564 bgcolor=#E9E9E9
| 155564 ||  || — || November 5, 1999 || Socorro || LINEAR || — || align=right | 5.6 km || 
|-id=565 bgcolor=#d6d6d6
| 155565 ||  || — || November 12, 1999 || Socorro || LINEAR || — || align=right | 4.3 km || 
|-id=566 bgcolor=#d6d6d6
| 155566 ||  || — || November 12, 1999 || Socorro || LINEAR || THM || align=right | 2.9 km || 
|-id=567 bgcolor=#d6d6d6
| 155567 ||  || — || November 29, 1999 || Kitt Peak || Spacewatch || THM || align=right | 2.7 km || 
|-id=568 bgcolor=#E9E9E9
| 155568 ||  || — || November 30, 1999 || Kitt Peak || Spacewatch || — || align=right | 4.2 km || 
|-id=569 bgcolor=#E9E9E9
| 155569 ||  || — || November 30, 1999 || Kitt Peak || Spacewatch || GEF || align=right | 2.2 km || 
|-id=570 bgcolor=#d6d6d6
| 155570 ||  || — || November 28, 1999 || Kitt Peak || Spacewatch || — || align=right | 5.1 km || 
|-id=571 bgcolor=#d6d6d6
| 155571 ||  || — || December 6, 1999 || Socorro || LINEAR || — || align=right | 6.5 km || 
|-id=572 bgcolor=#d6d6d6
| 155572 ||  || — || December 7, 1999 || Socorro || LINEAR || — || align=right | 5.0 km || 
|-id=573 bgcolor=#d6d6d6
| 155573 ||  || — || December 7, 1999 || Socorro || LINEAR || HYG || align=right | 4.2 km || 
|-id=574 bgcolor=#d6d6d6
| 155574 ||  || — || December 7, 1999 || Socorro || LINEAR || — || align=right | 4.5 km || 
|-id=575 bgcolor=#d6d6d6
| 155575 ||  || — || December 7, 1999 || Socorro || LINEAR || — || align=right | 6.7 km || 
|-id=576 bgcolor=#fefefe
| 155576 ||  || — || December 12, 1999 || Socorro || LINEAR || — || align=right | 1.2 km || 
|-id=577 bgcolor=#fefefe
| 155577 ||  || — || December 8, 1999 || Socorro || LINEAR || — || align=right | 1.6 km || 
|-id=578 bgcolor=#d6d6d6
| 155578 ||  || — || December 7, 1999 || Kitt Peak || Spacewatch || EOS || align=right | 3.6 km || 
|-id=579 bgcolor=#d6d6d6
| 155579 ||  || — || December 15, 1999 || Kitt Peak || Spacewatch || THM || align=right | 3.7 km || 
|-id=580 bgcolor=#d6d6d6
| 155580 ||  || — || December 4, 1999 || Catalina || CSS || — || align=right | 4.1 km || 
|-id=581 bgcolor=#fefefe
| 155581 ||  || — || December 16, 1999 || Kitt Peak || Spacewatch || — || align=right | 1.2 km || 
|-id=582 bgcolor=#d6d6d6
| 155582 ||  || — || December 31, 1999 || Kitt Peak || Spacewatch || — || align=right | 3.8 km || 
|-id=583 bgcolor=#d6d6d6
| 155583 ||  || — || January 7, 2000 || Socorro || LINEAR || — || align=right | 8.2 km || 
|-id=584 bgcolor=#fefefe
| 155584 ||  || — || January 3, 2000 || Socorro || LINEAR || — || align=right | 1.7 km || 
|-id=585 bgcolor=#d6d6d6
| 155585 ||  || — || January 8, 2000 || Socorro || LINEAR || — || align=right | 5.6 km || 
|-id=586 bgcolor=#fefefe
| 155586 ||  || — || January 7, 2000 || Socorro || LINEAR || FLO || align=right | 1.4 km || 
|-id=587 bgcolor=#fefefe
| 155587 ||  || — || January 15, 2000 || Prescott || P. G. Comba || — || align=right | 1.4 km || 
|-id=588 bgcolor=#d6d6d6
| 155588 ||  || — || January 5, 2000 || Kitt Peak || Spacewatch || — || align=right | 5.4 km || 
|-id=589 bgcolor=#d6d6d6
| 155589 ||  || — || January 3, 2000 || Kitt Peak || Spacewatch || — || align=right | 7.4 km || 
|-id=590 bgcolor=#fefefe
| 155590 ||  || — || January 26, 2000 || Kitt Peak || Spacewatch || — || align=right | 1.0 km || 
|-id=591 bgcolor=#fefefe
| 155591 ||  || — || January 30, 2000 || Catalina || CSS || — || align=right | 1.1 km || 
|-id=592 bgcolor=#fefefe
| 155592 || 2000 CK || — || February 2, 2000 || Prescott || P. G. Comba || FLO || align=right data-sort-value="0.91" | 910 m || 
|-id=593 bgcolor=#d6d6d6
| 155593 ||  || — || February 2, 2000 || Socorro || LINEAR || — || align=right | 5.3 km || 
|-id=594 bgcolor=#fefefe
| 155594 ||  || — || February 2, 2000 || Socorro || LINEAR || FLO || align=right | 1.1 km || 
|-id=595 bgcolor=#fefefe
| 155595 ||  || — || February 2, 2000 || Socorro || LINEAR || FLO || align=right | 1.2 km || 
|-id=596 bgcolor=#fefefe
| 155596 ||  || — || February 2, 2000 || Socorro || LINEAR || FLO || align=right | 1.0 km || 
|-id=597 bgcolor=#fefefe
| 155597 ||  || — || February 2, 2000 || Socorro || LINEAR || — || align=right | 2.0 km || 
|-id=598 bgcolor=#d6d6d6
| 155598 ||  || — || February 1, 2000 || Kitt Peak || Spacewatch || — || align=right | 3.6 km || 
|-id=599 bgcolor=#d6d6d6
| 155599 ||  || — || February 8, 2000 || Kitt Peak || Spacewatch || — || align=right | 6.2 km || 
|-id=600 bgcolor=#fefefe
| 155600 ||  || — || February 4, 2000 || Socorro || LINEAR || FLO || align=right data-sort-value="0.97" | 970 m || 
|}

155601–155700 

|-bgcolor=#fefefe
| 155601 ||  || — || February 7, 2000 || Kitt Peak || Spacewatch || — || align=right | 1.5 km || 
|-id=602 bgcolor=#fefefe
| 155602 ||  || — || February 6, 2000 || Catalina || CSS || FLO || align=right | 1.1 km || 
|-id=603 bgcolor=#fefefe
| 155603 ||  || — || February 4, 2000 || Kitt Peak || Spacewatch || — || align=right | 1.0 km || 
|-id=604 bgcolor=#fefefe
| 155604 ||  || — || February 29, 2000 || Socorro || LINEAR || — || align=right | 1.6 km || 
|-id=605 bgcolor=#fefefe
| 155605 ||  || — || February 29, 2000 || Socorro || LINEAR || FLO || align=right | 1.0 km || 
|-id=606 bgcolor=#fefefe
| 155606 ||  || — || February 29, 2000 || Socorro || LINEAR || FLO || align=right | 1.5 km || 
|-id=607 bgcolor=#fefefe
| 155607 ||  || — || February 29, 2000 || Socorro || LINEAR || — || align=right | 3.4 km || 
|-id=608 bgcolor=#fefefe
| 155608 ||  || — || February 29, 2000 || Socorro || LINEAR || FLO || align=right | 1.7 km || 
|-id=609 bgcolor=#fefefe
| 155609 ||  || — || February 28, 2000 || Socorro || LINEAR || — || align=right | 1.7 km || 
|-id=610 bgcolor=#fefefe
| 155610 ||  || — || February 29, 2000 || Socorro || LINEAR || — || align=right | 1.2 km || 
|-id=611 bgcolor=#fefefe
| 155611 ||  || — || February 29, 2000 || Socorro || LINEAR || FLO || align=right | 1.2 km || 
|-id=612 bgcolor=#fefefe
| 155612 ||  || — || February 29, 2000 || Socorro || LINEAR || NYS || align=right | 1.8 km || 
|-id=613 bgcolor=#fefefe
| 155613 ||  || — || March 5, 2000 || Socorro || LINEAR || — || align=right | 1.6 km || 
|-id=614 bgcolor=#fefefe
| 155614 ||  || — || March 8, 2000 || Kitt Peak || Spacewatch || — || align=right | 1.2 km || 
|-id=615 bgcolor=#fefefe
| 155615 ||  || — || March 10, 2000 || Socorro || LINEAR || — || align=right | 1.1 km || 
|-id=616 bgcolor=#fefefe
| 155616 ||  || — || March 10, 2000 || Socorro || LINEAR || — || align=right | 1.1 km || 
|-id=617 bgcolor=#fefefe
| 155617 ||  || — || March 10, 2000 || Socorro || LINEAR || — || align=right | 1.5 km || 
|-id=618 bgcolor=#fefefe
| 155618 ||  || — || March 9, 2000 || Socorro || LINEAR || PHO || align=right | 1.9 km || 
|-id=619 bgcolor=#fefefe
| 155619 ||  || — || March 12, 2000 || Kitt Peak || Spacewatch || FLO || align=right | 2.5 km || 
|-id=620 bgcolor=#fefefe
| 155620 ||  || — || March 12, 2000 || Kitt Peak || Spacewatch || — || align=right | 1.2 km || 
|-id=621 bgcolor=#fefefe
| 155621 ||  || — || March 14, 2000 || Kitt Peak || Spacewatch || — || align=right data-sort-value="0.94" | 940 m || 
|-id=622 bgcolor=#fefefe
| 155622 ||  || — || March 3, 2000 || Catalina || CSS || FLO || align=right | 1.7 km || 
|-id=623 bgcolor=#fefefe
| 155623 ||  || — || March 5, 2000 || Socorro || LINEAR || FLO || align=right | 1.5 km || 
|-id=624 bgcolor=#fefefe
| 155624 ||  || — || March 4, 2000 || Socorro || LINEAR || — || align=right | 1.9 km || 
|-id=625 bgcolor=#fefefe
| 155625 ||  || — || March 26, 2000 || Kitt Peak || Spacewatch || V || align=right | 1.3 km || 
|-id=626 bgcolor=#fefefe
| 155626 ||  || — || March 29, 2000 || Socorro || LINEAR || PHO || align=right | 1.7 km || 
|-id=627 bgcolor=#fefefe
| 155627 ||  || — || March 29, 2000 || Socorro || LINEAR || — || align=right | 3.1 km || 
|-id=628 bgcolor=#fefefe
| 155628 ||  || — || March 27, 2000 || Anderson Mesa || LONEOS || V || align=right | 1.4 km || 
|-id=629 bgcolor=#fefefe
| 155629 ||  || — || March 29, 2000 || Socorro || LINEAR || — || align=right | 3.9 km || 
|-id=630 bgcolor=#fefefe
| 155630 ||  || — || March 29, 2000 || Socorro || LINEAR || FLO || align=right | 1.1 km || 
|-id=631 bgcolor=#fefefe
| 155631 ||  || — || March 25, 2000 || Kitt Peak || Spacewatch || — || align=right | 1.2 km || 
|-id=632 bgcolor=#fefefe
| 155632 ||  || — || March 25, 2000 || Kitt Peak || Spacewatch || — || align=right data-sort-value="0.67" | 670 m || 
|-id=633 bgcolor=#fefefe
| 155633 || 2000 GE || — || April 1, 2000 || Kitt Peak || Spacewatch || — || align=right | 1.4 km || 
|-id=634 bgcolor=#fefefe
| 155634 ||  || — || April 5, 2000 || Prescott || P. G. Comba || — || align=right | 1.1 km || 
|-id=635 bgcolor=#fefefe
| 155635 ||  || — || April 4, 2000 || Socorro || LINEAR || PHO || align=right | 2.4 km || 
|-id=636 bgcolor=#fefefe
| 155636 ||  || — || April 5, 2000 || Socorro || LINEAR || — || align=right data-sort-value="0.90" | 900 m || 
|-id=637 bgcolor=#fefefe
| 155637 ||  || — || April 5, 2000 || Socorro || LINEAR || — || align=right | 1.6 km || 
|-id=638 bgcolor=#fefefe
| 155638 ||  || — || April 5, 2000 || Socorro || LINEAR || — || align=right | 1.4 km || 
|-id=639 bgcolor=#fefefe
| 155639 ||  || — || April 5, 2000 || Socorro || LINEAR || NYS || align=right | 2.9 km || 
|-id=640 bgcolor=#fefefe
| 155640 ||  || — || April 5, 2000 || Socorro || LINEAR || — || align=right | 1.2 km || 
|-id=641 bgcolor=#fefefe
| 155641 ||  || — || April 5, 2000 || Socorro || LINEAR || — || align=right | 1.2 km || 
|-id=642 bgcolor=#fefefe
| 155642 ||  || — || April 5, 2000 || Socorro || LINEAR || V || align=right data-sort-value="0.92" | 920 m || 
|-id=643 bgcolor=#fefefe
| 155643 ||  || — || April 5, 2000 || Socorro || LINEAR || NYS || align=right data-sort-value="0.85" | 850 m || 
|-id=644 bgcolor=#fefefe
| 155644 ||  || — || April 5, 2000 || Socorro || LINEAR || MAS || align=right | 1.1 km || 
|-id=645 bgcolor=#fefefe
| 155645 ||  || — || April 5, 2000 || Socorro || LINEAR || — || align=right | 1.3 km || 
|-id=646 bgcolor=#fefefe
| 155646 ||  || — || April 5, 2000 || Socorro || LINEAR || FLO || align=right | 1.5 km || 
|-id=647 bgcolor=#fefefe
| 155647 ||  || — || April 5, 2000 || Socorro || LINEAR || NYS || align=right data-sort-value="0.90" | 900 m || 
|-id=648 bgcolor=#fefefe
| 155648 ||  || — || April 8, 2000 || Socorro || LINEAR || — || align=right | 1.3 km || 
|-id=649 bgcolor=#fefefe
| 155649 ||  || — || April 4, 2000 || Socorro || LINEAR || — || align=right | 3.0 km || 
|-id=650 bgcolor=#fefefe
| 155650 ||  || — || April 5, 2000 || Socorro || LINEAR || — || align=right | 1.9 km || 
|-id=651 bgcolor=#fefefe
| 155651 ||  || — || April 7, 2000 || Socorro || LINEAR || — || align=right | 1.6 km || 
|-id=652 bgcolor=#fefefe
| 155652 ||  || — || April 7, 2000 || Kitt Peak || Spacewatch || NYS || align=right data-sort-value="0.78" | 780 m || 
|-id=653 bgcolor=#fefefe
| 155653 ||  || — || April 10, 2000 || Kitt Peak || Spacewatch || — || align=right | 1.5 km || 
|-id=654 bgcolor=#fefefe
| 155654 ||  || — || April 7, 2000 || Anderson Mesa || LONEOS || — || align=right | 2.2 km || 
|-id=655 bgcolor=#fefefe
| 155655 ||  || — || April 7, 2000 || Kitt Peak || Spacewatch || MAS || align=right data-sort-value="0.89" | 890 m || 
|-id=656 bgcolor=#fefefe
| 155656 ||  || — || April 5, 2000 || Socorro || LINEAR || V || align=right | 1.1 km || 
|-id=657 bgcolor=#fefefe
| 155657 ||  || — || April 6, 2000 || Socorro || LINEAR || — || align=right data-sort-value="0.80" | 800 m || 
|-id=658 bgcolor=#fefefe
| 155658 ||  || — || April 7, 2000 || Socorro || LINEAR || — || align=right | 1.3 km || 
|-id=659 bgcolor=#fefefe
| 155659 ||  || — || April 3, 2000 || Socorro || LINEAR || V || align=right | 1.2 km || 
|-id=660 bgcolor=#fefefe
| 155660 ||  || — || April 26, 2000 || Kitt Peak || Spacewatch || — || align=right | 1.5 km || 
|-id=661 bgcolor=#fefefe
| 155661 ||  || — || April 28, 2000 || Socorro || LINEAR || PHO || align=right | 1.9 km || 
|-id=662 bgcolor=#fefefe
| 155662 ||  || — || April 28, 2000 || Kitt Peak || Spacewatch || — || align=right | 1.8 km || 
|-id=663 bgcolor=#fefefe
| 155663 ||  || — || April 27, 2000 || Socorro || LINEAR || NYS || align=right data-sort-value="0.91" | 910 m || 
|-id=664 bgcolor=#fefefe
| 155664 ||  || — || April 29, 2000 || Socorro || LINEAR || — || align=right | 2.8 km || 
|-id=665 bgcolor=#fefefe
| 155665 ||  || — || April 30, 2000 || Socorro || LINEAR || NYS || align=right data-sort-value="0.97" | 970 m || 
|-id=666 bgcolor=#fefefe
| 155666 ||  || — || April 24, 2000 || Anderson Mesa || LONEOS || FLO || align=right data-sort-value="0.91" | 910 m || 
|-id=667 bgcolor=#fefefe
| 155667 ||  || — || April 29, 2000 || Socorro || LINEAR || PHO || align=right | 2.1 km || 
|-id=668 bgcolor=#fefefe
| 155668 ||  || — || April 29, 2000 || Socorro || LINEAR || — || align=right | 1.1 km || 
|-id=669 bgcolor=#fefefe
| 155669 ||  || — || April 29, 2000 || Socorro || LINEAR || MAS || align=right | 1.00 km || 
|-id=670 bgcolor=#fefefe
| 155670 ||  || — || April 29, 2000 || Socorro || LINEAR || NYS || align=right | 2.3 km || 
|-id=671 bgcolor=#fefefe
| 155671 ||  || — || April 29, 2000 || Socorro || LINEAR || NYS || align=right | 1.1 km || 
|-id=672 bgcolor=#fefefe
| 155672 ||  || — || April 25, 2000 || Anderson Mesa || LONEOS || — || align=right | 2.3 km || 
|-id=673 bgcolor=#fefefe
| 155673 ||  || — || April 25, 2000 || Anderson Mesa || LONEOS || V || align=right | 1.1 km || 
|-id=674 bgcolor=#fefefe
| 155674 ||  || — || April 26, 2000 || Anderson Mesa || LONEOS || — || align=right | 1.0 km || 
|-id=675 bgcolor=#fefefe
| 155675 ||  || — || April 26, 2000 || Kitt Peak || Spacewatch || — || align=right | 1.8 km || 
|-id=676 bgcolor=#fefefe
| 155676 ||  || — || April 29, 2000 || Socorro || LINEAR || — || align=right | 2.1 km || 
|-id=677 bgcolor=#fefefe
| 155677 ||  || — || May 3, 2000 || Prescott || P. G. Comba || NYS || align=right | 1.3 km || 
|-id=678 bgcolor=#fefefe
| 155678 ||  || — || May 3, 2000 || Socorro || LINEAR || PHO || align=right | 2.1 km || 
|-id=679 bgcolor=#fefefe
| 155679 ||  || — || May 4, 2000 || Kleť || Kleť Obs. || — || align=right | 1.8 km || 
|-id=680 bgcolor=#fefefe
| 155680 ||  || — || May 9, 2000 || Baton Rouge || W. R. Cooney Jr. || V || align=right data-sort-value="0.99" | 990 m || 
|-id=681 bgcolor=#fefefe
| 155681 ||  || — || May 6, 2000 || Socorro || LINEAR || FLO || align=right | 1.2 km || 
|-id=682 bgcolor=#fefefe
| 155682 ||  || — || May 7, 2000 || Socorro || LINEAR || — || align=right | 1.2 km || 
|-id=683 bgcolor=#fefefe
| 155683 ||  || — || May 9, 2000 || Socorro || LINEAR || NYS || align=right | 1.0 km || 
|-id=684 bgcolor=#FA8072
| 155684 ||  || — || May 6, 2000 || Socorro || LINEAR || — || align=right | 1.2 km || 
|-id=685 bgcolor=#fefefe
| 155685 ||  || — || May 4, 2000 || Socorro || LINEAR || PHO || align=right | 1.4 km || 
|-id=686 bgcolor=#fefefe
| 155686 ||  || — || May 28, 2000 || Socorro || LINEAR || NYS || align=right | 1.1 km || 
|-id=687 bgcolor=#fefefe
| 155687 ||  || — || May 24, 2000 || Kitt Peak || Spacewatch || V || align=right | 1.2 km || 
|-id=688 bgcolor=#fefefe
| 155688 ||  || — || May 30, 2000 || Kitt Peak || Spacewatch || NYS || align=right data-sort-value="0.58" | 580 m || 
|-id=689 bgcolor=#fefefe
| 155689 ||  || — || June 4, 2000 || Črni Vrh || Črni Vrh || — || align=right | 1.8 km || 
|-id=690 bgcolor=#fefefe
| 155690 ||  || — || July 23, 2000 || Socorro || LINEAR || NYS || align=right | 1.3 km || 
|-id=691 bgcolor=#E9E9E9
| 155691 ||  || — || July 31, 2000 || Socorro || LINEAR || — || align=right | 5.8 km || 
|-id=692 bgcolor=#fefefe
| 155692 ||  || — || July 30, 2000 || Socorro || LINEAR || ERI || align=right | 2.9 km || 
|-id=693 bgcolor=#fefefe
| 155693 ||  || — || July 30, 2000 || Socorro || LINEAR || PHO || align=right | 2.2 km || 
|-id=694 bgcolor=#fefefe
| 155694 ||  || — || August 1, 2000 || Socorro || LINEAR || — || align=right | 1.5 km || 
|-id=695 bgcolor=#E9E9E9
| 155695 ||  || — || August 1, 2000 || Socorro || LINEAR || — || align=right | 3.9 km || 
|-id=696 bgcolor=#fefefe
| 155696 ||  || — || August 25, 2000 || Socorro || LINEAR || NYS || align=right | 1.2 km || 
|-id=697 bgcolor=#E9E9E9
| 155697 ||  || — || August 25, 2000 || Socorro || LINEAR || MIT || align=right | 4.0 km || 
|-id=698 bgcolor=#E9E9E9
| 155698 ||  || — || August 24, 2000 || Socorro || LINEAR || GEF || align=right | 2.2 km || 
|-id=699 bgcolor=#E9E9E9
| 155699 ||  || — || August 24, 2000 || Socorro || LINEAR || — || align=right | 2.7 km || 
|-id=700 bgcolor=#E9E9E9
| 155700 ||  || — || August 28, 2000 || Socorro || LINEAR || — || align=right | 1.8 km || 
|}

155701–155800 

|-bgcolor=#E9E9E9
| 155701 ||  || — || August 28, 2000 || Socorro || LINEAR || — || align=right | 1.8 km || 
|-id=702 bgcolor=#E9E9E9
| 155702 ||  || — || August 26, 2000 || Kitt Peak || Spacewatch || EUN || align=right | 2.1 km || 
|-id=703 bgcolor=#fefefe
| 155703 ||  || — || August 24, 2000 || Socorro || LINEAR || — || align=right | 2.1 km || 
|-id=704 bgcolor=#fefefe
| 155704 ||  || — || August 25, 2000 || Socorro || LINEAR || — || align=right | 1.7 km || 
|-id=705 bgcolor=#E9E9E9
| 155705 ||  || — || August 28, 2000 || Socorro || LINEAR || — || align=right | 1.8 km || 
|-id=706 bgcolor=#E9E9E9
| 155706 ||  || — || August 25, 2000 || Socorro || LINEAR || — || align=right | 3.0 km || 
|-id=707 bgcolor=#E9E9E9
| 155707 ||  || — || August 25, 2000 || Socorro || LINEAR || — || align=right | 3.7 km || 
|-id=708 bgcolor=#E9E9E9
| 155708 ||  || — || August 31, 2000 || Socorro || LINEAR || — || align=right | 1.6 km || 
|-id=709 bgcolor=#E9E9E9
| 155709 ||  || — || August 28, 2000 || Socorro || LINEAR || — || align=right | 2.2 km || 
|-id=710 bgcolor=#E9E9E9
| 155710 ||  || — || August 25, 2000 || Socorro || LINEAR || — || align=right | 3.7 km || 
|-id=711 bgcolor=#fefefe
| 155711 ||  || — || August 31, 2000 || Socorro || LINEAR || — || align=right | 1.4 km || 
|-id=712 bgcolor=#fefefe
| 155712 ||  || — || August 31, 2000 || Socorro || LINEAR || V || align=right | 1.3 km || 
|-id=713 bgcolor=#E9E9E9
| 155713 ||  || — || August 26, 2000 || Socorro || LINEAR || — || align=right | 1.5 km || 
|-id=714 bgcolor=#E9E9E9
| 155714 ||  || — || August 26, 2000 || Socorro || LINEAR || JUN || align=right | 2.2 km || 
|-id=715 bgcolor=#E9E9E9
| 155715 ||  || — || August 26, 2000 || Socorro || LINEAR || — || align=right | 2.8 km || 
|-id=716 bgcolor=#E9E9E9
| 155716 ||  || — || August 28, 2000 || Socorro || LINEAR || — || align=right | 2.5 km || 
|-id=717 bgcolor=#fefefe
| 155717 ||  || — || August 31, 2000 || Socorro || LINEAR || — || align=right | 1.3 km || 
|-id=718 bgcolor=#E9E9E9
| 155718 ||  || — || August 31, 2000 || Socorro || LINEAR || — || align=right | 4.7 km || 
|-id=719 bgcolor=#E9E9E9
| 155719 ||  || — || August 31, 2000 || Socorro || LINEAR || — || align=right | 1.6 km || 
|-id=720 bgcolor=#E9E9E9
| 155720 ||  || — || August 31, 2000 || Socorro || LINEAR || MAR || align=right | 1.7 km || 
|-id=721 bgcolor=#E9E9E9
| 155721 ||  || — || August 31, 2000 || Socorro || LINEAR || — || align=right | 1.7 km || 
|-id=722 bgcolor=#E9E9E9
| 155722 ||  || — || August 21, 2000 || Anderson Mesa || LONEOS || MAR || align=right | 1.9 km || 
|-id=723 bgcolor=#E9E9E9
| 155723 ||  || — || August 31, 2000 || Socorro || LINEAR || — || align=right | 3.3 km || 
|-id=724 bgcolor=#fefefe
| 155724 ||  || — || August 24, 2000 || Socorro || LINEAR || NYS || align=right | 1.1 km || 
|-id=725 bgcolor=#FA8072
| 155725 ||  || — || September 1, 2000 || Socorro || LINEAR || — || align=right | 1.2 km || 
|-id=726 bgcolor=#fefefe
| 155726 ||  || — || September 1, 2000 || Socorro || LINEAR || — || align=right | 2.8 km || 
|-id=727 bgcolor=#E9E9E9
| 155727 ||  || — || September 3, 2000 || Socorro || LINEAR || — || align=right | 1.9 km || 
|-id=728 bgcolor=#E9E9E9
| 155728 ||  || — || September 3, 2000 || Socorro || LINEAR || MAR || align=right | 2.2 km || 
|-id=729 bgcolor=#E9E9E9
| 155729 ||  || — || September 3, 2000 || Socorro || LINEAR || — || align=right | 4.0 km || 
|-id=730 bgcolor=#E9E9E9
| 155730 ||  || — || September 1, 2000 || Socorro || LINEAR || EUN || align=right | 2.0 km || 
|-id=731 bgcolor=#E9E9E9
| 155731 ||  || — || September 1, 2000 || Socorro || LINEAR || HNS || align=right | 2.3 km || 
|-id=732 bgcolor=#E9E9E9
| 155732 ||  || — || September 2, 2000 || Anderson Mesa || LONEOS || — || align=right | 1.7 km || 
|-id=733 bgcolor=#E9E9E9
| 155733 ||  || — || September 3, 2000 || Socorro || LINEAR || — || align=right | 2.0 km || 
|-id=734 bgcolor=#E9E9E9
| 155734 ||  || — || September 5, 2000 || Anderson Mesa || LONEOS || MAR || align=right | 1.9 km || 
|-id=735 bgcolor=#E9E9E9
| 155735 ||  || — || September 5, 2000 || Anderson Mesa || LONEOS || MAR || align=right | 2.3 km || 
|-id=736 bgcolor=#E9E9E9
| 155736 ||  || — || September 5, 2000 || Anderson Mesa || LONEOS || HNS || align=right | 3.3 km || 
|-id=737 bgcolor=#E9E9E9
| 155737 ||  || — || September 20, 2000 || Socorro || LINEAR || GER || align=right | 2.5 km || 
|-id=738 bgcolor=#E9E9E9
| 155738 ||  || — || September 23, 2000 || Socorro || LINEAR || HNS || align=right | 2.5 km || 
|-id=739 bgcolor=#fefefe
| 155739 ||  || — || September 24, 2000 || Socorro || LINEAR || MAS || align=right | 1.0 km || 
|-id=740 bgcolor=#E9E9E9
| 155740 ||  || — || September 22, 2000 || Socorro || LINEAR || — || align=right | 3.0 km || 
|-id=741 bgcolor=#E9E9E9
| 155741 ||  || — || September 24, 2000 || Socorro || LINEAR || — || align=right | 3.3 km || 
|-id=742 bgcolor=#E9E9E9
| 155742 ||  || — || September 24, 2000 || Socorro || LINEAR || — || align=right | 1.4 km || 
|-id=743 bgcolor=#E9E9E9
| 155743 ||  || — || September 24, 2000 || Socorro || LINEAR || — || align=right | 2.3 km || 
|-id=744 bgcolor=#E9E9E9
| 155744 ||  || — || September 24, 2000 || Socorro || LINEAR || — || align=right | 1.6 km || 
|-id=745 bgcolor=#E9E9E9
| 155745 ||  || — || September 24, 2000 || Socorro || LINEAR || — || align=right | 3.2 km || 
|-id=746 bgcolor=#E9E9E9
| 155746 ||  || — || September 24, 2000 || Socorro || LINEAR || — || align=right | 1.4 km || 
|-id=747 bgcolor=#E9E9E9
| 155747 ||  || — || September 23, 2000 || Socorro || LINEAR || KRM || align=right | 3.4 km || 
|-id=748 bgcolor=#E9E9E9
| 155748 ||  || — || September 23, 2000 || Socorro || LINEAR || — || align=right | 3.0 km || 
|-id=749 bgcolor=#fefefe
| 155749 ||  || — || September 23, 2000 || Socorro || LINEAR || fast? || align=right | 1.8 km || 
|-id=750 bgcolor=#E9E9E9
| 155750 ||  || — || September 24, 2000 || Socorro || LINEAR || ADE || align=right | 3.7 km || 
|-id=751 bgcolor=#E9E9E9
| 155751 ||  || — || September 24, 2000 || Socorro || LINEAR || — || align=right | 1.9 km || 
|-id=752 bgcolor=#E9E9E9
| 155752 ||  || — || September 24, 2000 || Socorro || LINEAR || KON || align=right | 3.7 km || 
|-id=753 bgcolor=#E9E9E9
| 155753 ||  || — || September 24, 2000 || Socorro || LINEAR || — || align=right | 2.9 km || 
|-id=754 bgcolor=#E9E9E9
| 155754 ||  || — || September 24, 2000 || Socorro || LINEAR || — || align=right | 1.7 km || 
|-id=755 bgcolor=#E9E9E9
| 155755 ||  || — || September 24, 2000 || Socorro || LINEAR || — || align=right | 3.4 km || 
|-id=756 bgcolor=#E9E9E9
| 155756 ||  || — || September 24, 2000 || Socorro || LINEAR || BRG || align=right | 2.3 km || 
|-id=757 bgcolor=#E9E9E9
| 155757 ||  || — || September 23, 2000 || Socorro || LINEAR || — || align=right | 1.8 km || 
|-id=758 bgcolor=#E9E9E9
| 155758 ||  || — || September 23, 2000 || Socorro || LINEAR || — || align=right | 1.7 km || 
|-id=759 bgcolor=#E9E9E9
| 155759 ||  || — || September 23, 2000 || Socorro || LINEAR || — || align=right | 1.7 km || 
|-id=760 bgcolor=#E9E9E9
| 155760 ||  || — || September 24, 2000 || Socorro || LINEAR || — || align=right | 1.3 km || 
|-id=761 bgcolor=#E9E9E9
| 155761 ||  || — || September 19, 2000 || Haleakala || NEAT || — || align=right | 4.2 km || 
|-id=762 bgcolor=#fefefe
| 155762 ||  || — || September 24, 2000 || Socorro || LINEAR || H || align=right | 1.2 km || 
|-id=763 bgcolor=#E9E9E9
| 155763 ||  || — || September 28, 2000 || Socorro || LINEAR || — || align=right | 3.5 km || 
|-id=764 bgcolor=#E9E9E9
| 155764 ||  || — || September 28, 2000 || Socorro || LINEAR || — || align=right | 1.9 km || 
|-id=765 bgcolor=#E9E9E9
| 155765 ||  || — || September 22, 2000 || Kitt Peak || Spacewatch || GEF || align=right | 2.0 km || 
|-id=766 bgcolor=#E9E9E9
| 155766 ||  || — || September 27, 2000 || Socorro || LINEAR || — || align=right | 2.3 km || 
|-id=767 bgcolor=#E9E9E9
| 155767 ||  || — || September 28, 2000 || Socorro || LINEAR || PAD || align=right | 2.8 km || 
|-id=768 bgcolor=#fefefe
| 155768 ||  || — || September 26, 2000 || Socorro || LINEAR || H || align=right data-sort-value="0.79" | 790 m || 
|-id=769 bgcolor=#fefefe
| 155769 ||  || — || September 30, 2000 || Socorro || LINEAR || H || align=right | 1.2 km || 
|-id=770 bgcolor=#E9E9E9
| 155770 ||  || — || September 25, 2000 || Socorro || LINEAR || — || align=right | 1.8 km || 
|-id=771 bgcolor=#E9E9E9
| 155771 ||  || — || September 26, 2000 || Socorro || LINEAR || — || align=right | 2.1 km || 
|-id=772 bgcolor=#FA8072
| 155772 ||  || — || September 25, 2000 || Socorro || LINEAR || H || align=right | 1.3 km || 
|-id=773 bgcolor=#fefefe
| 155773 ||  || — || September 26, 2000 || Socorro || LINEAR || H || align=right | 1.3 km || 
|-id=774 bgcolor=#E9E9E9
| 155774 ||  || — || September 24, 2000 || Socorro || LINEAR || — || align=right | 2.3 km || 
|-id=775 bgcolor=#E9E9E9
| 155775 ||  || — || September 24, 2000 || Socorro || LINEAR || — || align=right | 1.7 km || 
|-id=776 bgcolor=#E9E9E9
| 155776 ||  || — || September 28, 2000 || Socorro || LINEAR || MAR || align=right | 1.8 km || 
|-id=777 bgcolor=#E9E9E9
| 155777 ||  || — || September 23, 2000 || Socorro || LINEAR || MAR || align=right | 2.0 km || 
|-id=778 bgcolor=#E9E9E9
| 155778 ||  || — || September 26, 2000 || Socorro || LINEAR || — || align=right | 2.9 km || 
|-id=779 bgcolor=#E9E9E9
| 155779 ||  || — || September 27, 2000 || Socorro || LINEAR || AER || align=right | 2.1 km || 
|-id=780 bgcolor=#E9E9E9
| 155780 ||  || — || September 30, 2000 || Socorro || LINEAR || — || align=right | 5.2 km || 
|-id=781 bgcolor=#E9E9E9
| 155781 ||  || — || September 27, 2000 || Socorro || LINEAR || — || align=right | 2.5 km || 
|-id=782 bgcolor=#E9E9E9
| 155782 ||  || — || September 26, 2000 || Haleakala || NEAT || — || align=right | 3.6 km || 
|-id=783 bgcolor=#E9E9E9
| 155783 ||  || — || September 25, 2000 || Haleakala || NEAT || — || align=right | 5.6 km || 
|-id=784 bgcolor=#fefefe
| 155784 Ercol ||  ||  || September 19, 2000 || Kitt Peak || M. W. Buie || — || align=right | 1.3 km || 
|-id=785 bgcolor=#FA8072
| 155785 ||  || — || September 29, 2000 || Anderson Mesa || LONEOS || — || align=right | 1.4 km || 
|-id=786 bgcolor=#C2FFFF
| 155786 ||  || — || September 28, 2000 || Anderson Mesa || LONEOS || L5 || align=right | 16 km || 
|-id=787 bgcolor=#E9E9E9
| 155787 ||  || — || September 21, 2000 || Anderson Mesa || LONEOS || — || align=right | 1.2 km || 
|-id=788 bgcolor=#E9E9E9
| 155788 ||  || — || September 23, 2000 || Anderson Mesa || LONEOS || KRM || align=right | 3.3 km || 
|-id=789 bgcolor=#C2FFFF
| 155789 ||  || — || October 1, 2000 || Socorro || LINEAR || L5 || align=right | 11 km || 
|-id=790 bgcolor=#E9E9E9
| 155790 ||  || — || October 1, 2000 || Socorro || LINEAR || — || align=right | 1.2 km || 
|-id=791 bgcolor=#E9E9E9
| 155791 ||  || — || October 1, 2000 || Socorro || LINEAR || — || align=right | 3.9 km || 
|-id=792 bgcolor=#E9E9E9
| 155792 ||  || — || October 2, 2000 || Socorro || LINEAR || — || align=right | 2.1 km || 
|-id=793 bgcolor=#E9E9E9
| 155793 ||  || — || October 1, 2000 || Socorro || LINEAR || — || align=right | 2.3 km || 
|-id=794 bgcolor=#E9E9E9
| 155794 ||  || — || October 1, 2000 || Socorro || LINEAR || — || align=right | 2.1 km || 
|-id=795 bgcolor=#E9E9E9
| 155795 ||  || — || October 24, 2000 || Socorro || LINEAR || — || align=right | 3.9 km || 
|-id=796 bgcolor=#E9E9E9
| 155796 ||  || — || October 24, 2000 || Črni Vrh || Črni Vrh || — || align=right | 1.4 km || 
|-id=797 bgcolor=#d6d6d6
| 155797 ||  || — || October 24, 2000 || Socorro || LINEAR || — || align=right | 4.1 km || 
|-id=798 bgcolor=#E9E9E9
| 155798 ||  || — || October 24, 2000 || Socorro || LINEAR || — || align=right | 3.6 km || 
|-id=799 bgcolor=#E9E9E9
| 155799 ||  || — || October 24, 2000 || Socorro || LINEAR || — || align=right | 2.8 km || 
|-id=800 bgcolor=#E9E9E9
| 155800 ||  || — || October 24, 2000 || Socorro || LINEAR || — || align=right | 2.0 km || 
|}

155801–155900 

|-bgcolor=#E9E9E9
| 155801 ||  || — || October 25, 2000 || Socorro || LINEAR || — || align=right | 1.4 km || 
|-id=802 bgcolor=#E9E9E9
| 155802 ||  || — || October 25, 2000 || Socorro || LINEAR || — || align=right | 3.7 km || 
|-id=803 bgcolor=#E9E9E9
| 155803 ||  || — || October 30, 2000 || Socorro || LINEAR || — || align=right | 2.4 km || 
|-id=804 bgcolor=#E9E9E9
| 155804 ||  || — || November 1, 2000 || Socorro || LINEAR || WIT || align=right | 2.0 km || 
|-id=805 bgcolor=#E9E9E9
| 155805 ||  || — || November 1, 2000 || Socorro || LINEAR || NEM || align=right | 3.0 km || 
|-id=806 bgcolor=#E9E9E9
| 155806 ||  || — || November 1, 2000 || Socorro || LINEAR || — || align=right | 2.2 km || 
|-id=807 bgcolor=#E9E9E9
| 155807 ||  || — || November 1, 2000 || Socorro || LINEAR || — || align=right | 2.6 km || 
|-id=808 bgcolor=#d6d6d6
| 155808 ||  || — || November 3, 2000 || Socorro || LINEAR || — || align=right | 3.9 km || 
|-id=809 bgcolor=#E9E9E9
| 155809 ||  || — || November 3, 2000 || Socorro || LINEAR || — || align=right | 1.8 km || 
|-id=810 bgcolor=#E9E9E9
| 155810 ||  || — || November 1, 2000 || Socorro || LINEAR || — || align=right | 4.1 km || 
|-id=811 bgcolor=#E9E9E9
| 155811 ||  || — || November 25, 2000 || Kitt Peak || Spacewatch || — || align=right | 2.5 km || 
|-id=812 bgcolor=#E9E9E9
| 155812 ||  || — || November 25, 2000 || Kitt Peak || Spacewatch || WIT || align=right | 2.0 km || 
|-id=813 bgcolor=#d6d6d6
| 155813 ||  || — || November 26, 2000 || Bohyunsan || Bohyunsan Obs. || KAR || align=right | 1.4 km || 
|-id=814 bgcolor=#E9E9E9
| 155814 ||  || — || November 20, 2000 || Socorro || LINEAR || — || align=right | 2.4 km || 
|-id=815 bgcolor=#E9E9E9
| 155815 ||  || — || November 20, 2000 || Socorro || LINEAR || DOR || align=right | 5.5 km || 
|-id=816 bgcolor=#fefefe
| 155816 ||  || — || November 27, 2000 || Socorro || LINEAR || H || align=right | 1.1 km || 
|-id=817 bgcolor=#E9E9E9
| 155817 ||  || — || November 20, 2000 || Socorro || LINEAR || — || align=right | 1.7 km || 
|-id=818 bgcolor=#E9E9E9
| 155818 ||  || — || November 21, 2000 || Socorro || LINEAR || — || align=right | 1.8 km || 
|-id=819 bgcolor=#E9E9E9
| 155819 ||  || — || November 21, 2000 || Socorro || LINEAR || — || align=right | 4.2 km || 
|-id=820 bgcolor=#E9E9E9
| 155820 ||  || — || November 21, 2000 || Socorro || LINEAR || MAR || align=right | 2.3 km || 
|-id=821 bgcolor=#d6d6d6
| 155821 ||  || — || November 16, 2000 || Kitt Peak || Spacewatch || — || align=right | 3.7 km || 
|-id=822 bgcolor=#E9E9E9
| 155822 ||  || — || November 20, 2000 || Kitt Peak || Spacewatch || — || align=right | 4.3 km || 
|-id=823 bgcolor=#fefefe
| 155823 ||  || — || November 20, 2000 || Socorro || LINEAR || H || align=right | 1.7 km || 
|-id=824 bgcolor=#d6d6d6
| 155824 ||  || — || November 30, 2000 || Haleakala || NEAT || — || align=right | 5.0 km || 
|-id=825 bgcolor=#E9E9E9
| 155825 ||  || — || November 20, 2000 || Anderson Mesa || LONEOS || — || align=right | 2.2 km || 
|-id=826 bgcolor=#E9E9E9
| 155826 ||  || — || November 25, 2000 || Socorro || LINEAR || MAR || align=right | 1.8 km || 
|-id=827 bgcolor=#E9E9E9
| 155827 ||  || — || November 28, 2000 || Socorro || LINEAR || — || align=right | 3.3 km || 
|-id=828 bgcolor=#fefefe
| 155828 ||  || — || December 1, 2000 || Socorro || LINEAR || H || align=right | 1.2 km || 
|-id=829 bgcolor=#E9E9E9
| 155829 ||  || — || December 4, 2000 || Socorro || LINEAR || GEF || align=right | 2.4 km || 
|-id=830 bgcolor=#E9E9E9
| 155830 ||  || — || December 4, 2000 || Socorro || LINEAR || — || align=right | 2.9 km || 
|-id=831 bgcolor=#d6d6d6
| 155831 ||  || — || December 15, 2000 || Socorro || LINEAR || EUP || align=right | 5.6 km || 
|-id=832 bgcolor=#E9E9E9
| 155832 ||  || — || December 6, 2000 || Socorro || LINEAR || — || align=right | 4.2 km || 
|-id=833 bgcolor=#E9E9E9
| 155833 || 2000 YB || — || December 16, 2000 || Kitt Peak || Spacewatch || — || align=right | 2.6 km || 
|-id=834 bgcolor=#d6d6d6
| 155834 ||  || — || December 18, 2000 || Kitt Peak || Spacewatch || — || align=right | 2.7 km || 
|-id=835 bgcolor=#E9E9E9
| 155835 ||  || — || December 21, 2000 || Eskridge || G. Hug || — || align=right | 4.8 km || 
|-id=836 bgcolor=#d6d6d6
| 155836 ||  || — || December 29, 2000 || Desert Beaver || W. K. Y. Yeung || — || align=right | 4.4 km || 
|-id=837 bgcolor=#d6d6d6
| 155837 ||  || — || December 23, 2000 || Socorro || LINEAR || — || align=right | 4.5 km || 
|-id=838 bgcolor=#d6d6d6
| 155838 ||  || — || December 30, 2000 || Socorro || LINEAR || — || align=right | 3.7 km || 
|-id=839 bgcolor=#d6d6d6
| 155839 ||  || — || December 30, 2000 || Socorro || LINEAR || EOS || align=right | 3.9 km || 
|-id=840 bgcolor=#d6d6d6
| 155840 ||  || — || December 30, 2000 || Socorro || LINEAR || — || align=right | 4.9 km || 
|-id=841 bgcolor=#E9E9E9
| 155841 ||  || — || December 30, 2000 || Socorro || LINEAR || — || align=right | 2.6 km || 
|-id=842 bgcolor=#d6d6d6
| 155842 ||  || — || December 30, 2000 || Socorro || LINEAR || CHA || align=right | 4.5 km || 
|-id=843 bgcolor=#d6d6d6
| 155843 ||  || — || December 30, 2000 || Haleakala || NEAT || — || align=right | 4.4 km || 
|-id=844 bgcolor=#d6d6d6
| 155844 ||  || — || December 30, 2000 || Socorro || LINEAR || BRA || align=right | 3.4 km || 
|-id=845 bgcolor=#fefefe
| 155845 ||  || — || January 4, 2001 || Fair Oaks Ranch || J. V. McClusky || H || align=right | 1.3 km || 
|-id=846 bgcolor=#d6d6d6
| 155846 ||  || — || January 5, 2001 || Socorro || LINEAR || — || align=right | 6.6 km || 
|-id=847 bgcolor=#d6d6d6
| 155847 ||  || — || January 4, 2001 || Socorro || LINEAR || — || align=right | 4.6 km || 
|-id=848 bgcolor=#d6d6d6
| 155848 ||  || — || January 15, 2001 || Oizumi || T. Kobayashi || AEG || align=right | 7.1 km || 
|-id=849 bgcolor=#d6d6d6
| 155849 ||  || — || January 15, 2001 || Socorro || LINEAR || EUP || align=right | 5.5 km || 
|-id=850 bgcolor=#fefefe
| 155850 ||  || — || January 15, 2001 || Socorro || LINEAR || H || align=right | 1.2 km || 
|-id=851 bgcolor=#fefefe
| 155851 ||  || — || January 19, 2001 || Socorro || LINEAR || H || align=right | 1.1 km || 
|-id=852 bgcolor=#d6d6d6
| 155852 ||  || — || January 19, 2001 || Socorro || LINEAR || — || align=right | 5.1 km || 
|-id=853 bgcolor=#d6d6d6
| 155853 ||  || — || January 20, 2001 || Socorro || LINEAR || — || align=right | 5.5 km || 
|-id=854 bgcolor=#d6d6d6
| 155854 ||  || — || January 20, 2001 || Socorro || LINEAR || — || align=right | 6.5 km || 
|-id=855 bgcolor=#d6d6d6
| 155855 ||  || — || January 19, 2001 || Kitt Peak || Spacewatch || — || align=right | 3.5 km || 
|-id=856 bgcolor=#d6d6d6
| 155856 ||  || — || January 21, 2001 || Socorro || LINEAR || AEG || align=right | 5.3 km || 
|-id=857 bgcolor=#d6d6d6
| 155857 ||  || — || January 21, 2001 || Socorro || LINEAR || — || align=right | 4.7 km || 
|-id=858 bgcolor=#d6d6d6
| 155858 ||  || — || January 16, 2001 || Haleakala || NEAT || — || align=right | 3.2 km || 
|-id=859 bgcolor=#d6d6d6
| 155859 ||  || — || January 31, 2001 || Socorro || LINEAR || — || align=right | 4.0 km || 
|-id=860 bgcolor=#d6d6d6
| 155860 ||  || — || January 25, 2001 || Socorro || LINEAR || — || align=right | 4.9 km || 
|-id=861 bgcolor=#d6d6d6
| 155861 ||  || — || February 13, 2001 || Socorro || LINEAR || — || align=right | 5.7 km || 
|-id=862 bgcolor=#d6d6d6
| 155862 ||  || — || February 13, 2001 || Socorro || LINEAR || — || align=right | 6.6 km || 
|-id=863 bgcolor=#d6d6d6
| 155863 ||  || — || February 13, 2001 || Socorro || LINEAR || TIR || align=right | 5.3 km || 
|-id=864 bgcolor=#d6d6d6
| 155864 ||  || — || February 13, 2001 || Socorro || LINEAR || — || align=right | 7.2 km || 
|-id=865 bgcolor=#d6d6d6
| 155865 || 2001 DK || — || February 16, 2001 || Desert Beaver || W. K. Y. Yeung || — || align=right | 5.0 km || 
|-id=866 bgcolor=#d6d6d6
| 155866 ||  || — || February 17, 2001 || Socorro || LINEAR || — || align=right | 4.7 km || 
|-id=867 bgcolor=#d6d6d6
| 155867 ||  || — || February 16, 2001 || Socorro || LINEAR || — || align=right | 6.5 km || 
|-id=868 bgcolor=#d6d6d6
| 155868 ||  || — || February 17, 2001 || Socorro || LINEAR || — || align=right | 6.4 km || 
|-id=869 bgcolor=#d6d6d6
| 155869 ||  || — || February 17, 2001 || Socorro || LINEAR || — || align=right | 4.1 km || 
|-id=870 bgcolor=#d6d6d6
| 155870 ||  || — || February 17, 2001 || Socorro || LINEAR || — || align=right | 4.0 km || 
|-id=871 bgcolor=#d6d6d6
| 155871 ||  || — || February 19, 2001 || Socorro || LINEAR || — || align=right | 5.0 km || 
|-id=872 bgcolor=#d6d6d6
| 155872 ||  || — || February 16, 2001 || Kitt Peak || Spacewatch || KOR || align=right | 2.1 km || 
|-id=873 bgcolor=#d6d6d6
| 155873 ||  || — || February 21, 2001 || Socorro || LINEAR || EUP || align=right | 9.2 km || 
|-id=874 bgcolor=#d6d6d6
| 155874 ||  || — || February 22, 2001 || Kitt Peak || Spacewatch || — || align=right | 5.2 km || 
|-id=875 bgcolor=#d6d6d6
| 155875 ||  || — || February 20, 2001 || Haleakala || NEAT || — || align=right | 5.4 km || 
|-id=876 bgcolor=#d6d6d6
| 155876 ||  || — || February 17, 2001 || Socorro || LINEAR || — || align=right | 5.1 km || 
|-id=877 bgcolor=#d6d6d6
| 155877 ||  || — || February 20, 2001 || Kitt Peak || Spacewatch || THM || align=right | 4.6 km || 
|-id=878 bgcolor=#d6d6d6
| 155878 ||  || — || March 2, 2001 || Anderson Mesa || LONEOS || — || align=right | 5.7 km || 
|-id=879 bgcolor=#d6d6d6
| 155879 ||  || — || March 2, 2001 || Anderson Mesa || LONEOS || — || align=right | 6.0 km || 
|-id=880 bgcolor=#d6d6d6
| 155880 ||  || — || March 2, 2001 || Anderson Mesa || LONEOS || — || align=right | 5.7 km || 
|-id=881 bgcolor=#d6d6d6
| 155881 ||  || — || March 14, 2001 || Haleakala || NEAT || — || align=right | 5.5 km || 
|-id=882 bgcolor=#d6d6d6
| 155882 ||  || — || March 18, 2001 || Socorro || LINEAR || — || align=right | 5.2 km || 
|-id=883 bgcolor=#d6d6d6
| 155883 ||  || — || March 18, 2001 || Socorro || LINEAR || — || align=right | 6.1 km || 
|-id=884 bgcolor=#d6d6d6
| 155884 ||  || — || March 18, 2001 || Socorro || LINEAR || THB || align=right | 7.2 km || 
|-id=885 bgcolor=#d6d6d6
| 155885 ||  || — || March 19, 2001 || Socorro || LINEAR || — || align=right | 5.4 km || 
|-id=886 bgcolor=#d6d6d6
| 155886 ||  || — || March 19, 2001 || Socorro || LINEAR || — || align=right | 6.4 km || 
|-id=887 bgcolor=#d6d6d6
| 155887 ||  || — || March 19, 2001 || Socorro || LINEAR || — || align=right | 7.2 km || 
|-id=888 bgcolor=#d6d6d6
| 155888 ||  || — || March 26, 2001 || Kitt Peak || Spacewatch || THM || align=right | 3.4 km || 
|-id=889 bgcolor=#d6d6d6
| 155889 ||  || — || March 26, 2001 || Kitt Peak || Spacewatch || EOS || align=right | 3.3 km || 
|-id=890 bgcolor=#d6d6d6
| 155890 ||  || — || March 26, 2001 || Kitt Peak || Spacewatch || — || align=right | 7.1 km || 
|-id=891 bgcolor=#d6d6d6
| 155891 ||  || — || March 21, 2001 || Anderson Mesa || LONEOS || MEL || align=right | 6.4 km || 
|-id=892 bgcolor=#d6d6d6
| 155892 ||  || — || March 16, 2001 || Socorro || LINEAR || — || align=right | 5.9 km || 
|-id=893 bgcolor=#d6d6d6
| 155893 ||  || — || March 17, 2001 || Socorro || LINEAR || — || align=right | 5.2 km || 
|-id=894 bgcolor=#d6d6d6
| 155894 ||  || — || March 18, 2001 || Anderson Mesa || LONEOS || HYG || align=right | 4.8 km || 
|-id=895 bgcolor=#d6d6d6
| 155895 ||  || — || March 18, 2001 || Socorro || LINEAR || — || align=right | 5.3 km || 
|-id=896 bgcolor=#d6d6d6
| 155896 ||  || — || March 18, 2001 || Socorro || LINEAR || ALA || align=right | 6.1 km || 
|-id=897 bgcolor=#d6d6d6
| 155897 ||  || — || March 19, 2001 || Socorro || LINEAR || — || align=right | 4.8 km || 
|-id=898 bgcolor=#d6d6d6
| 155898 ||  || — || March 19, 2001 || Socorro || LINEAR || — || align=right | 6.0 km || 
|-id=899 bgcolor=#d6d6d6
| 155899 ||  || — || March 21, 2001 || Haleakala || NEAT || — || align=right | 4.2 km || 
|-id=900 bgcolor=#d6d6d6
| 155900 ||  || — || March 23, 2001 || Anderson Mesa || LONEOS || — || align=right | 5.7 km || 
|}

155901–156000 

|-bgcolor=#d6d6d6
| 155901 ||  || — || March 20, 2001 || Anderson Mesa || LONEOS || URS || align=right | 5.8 km || 
|-id=902 bgcolor=#d6d6d6
| 155902 ||  || — || March 25, 2001 || Kitt Peak || M. W. Buie || HYG || align=right | 5.2 km || 
|-id=903 bgcolor=#d6d6d6
| 155903 ||  || — || March 26, 2001 || Kitt Peak || M. W. Buie || EOS || align=right | 4.0 km || 
|-id=904 bgcolor=#d6d6d6
| 155904 ||  || — || April 23, 2001 || Kitt Peak || Spacewatch || — || align=right | 5.4 km || 
|-id=905 bgcolor=#d6d6d6
| 155905 ||  || — || April 25, 2001 || Anderson Mesa || LONEOS || EUP || align=right | 7.4 km || 
|-id=906 bgcolor=#d6d6d6
| 155906 ||  || — || June 23, 2001 || Palomar || NEAT || — || align=right | 6.0 km || 
|-id=907 bgcolor=#fefefe
| 155907 ||  || — || June 27, 2001 || Haleakala || NEAT || — || align=right | 1.4 km || 
|-id=908 bgcolor=#fefefe
| 155908 ||  || — || July 13, 2001 || Palomar || NEAT || — || align=right | 1.2 km || 
|-id=909 bgcolor=#fefefe
| 155909 ||  || — || July 13, 2001 || Palomar || NEAT || FLO || align=right | 1.1 km || 
|-id=910 bgcolor=#fefefe
| 155910 || 2001 OH || — || July 16, 2001 || Anderson Mesa || LONEOS || — || align=right | 1.3 km || 
|-id=911 bgcolor=#fefefe
| 155911 ||  || — || July 20, 2001 || Palomar || NEAT || — || align=right | 1.6 km || 
|-id=912 bgcolor=#fefefe
| 155912 ||  || — || July 20, 2001 || Palomar || NEAT || — || align=right | 1.7 km || 
|-id=913 bgcolor=#fefefe
| 155913 ||  || — || July 23, 2001 || Palomar || NEAT || — || align=right | 1.7 km || 
|-id=914 bgcolor=#fefefe
| 155914 ||  || — || July 22, 2001 || Palomar || NEAT || V || align=right | 1.2 km || 
|-id=915 bgcolor=#fefefe
| 155915 ||  || — || July 22, 2001 || Palomar || NEAT || — || align=right | 1.6 km || 
|-id=916 bgcolor=#fefefe
| 155916 ||  || — || July 16, 2001 || Anderson Mesa || LONEOS || — || align=right | 1.3 km || 
|-id=917 bgcolor=#fefefe
| 155917 ||  || — || July 21, 2001 || Anderson Mesa || LONEOS || FLO || align=right | 1.4 km || 
|-id=918 bgcolor=#fefefe
| 155918 ||  || — || July 22, 2001 || Socorro || LINEAR || NYS || align=right data-sort-value="0.96" | 960 m || 
|-id=919 bgcolor=#fefefe
| 155919 ||  || — || July 31, 2001 || Palomar || NEAT || — || align=right | 1.3 km || 
|-id=920 bgcolor=#fefefe
| 155920 ||  || — || July 30, 2001 || Socorro || LINEAR || — || align=right | 1.1 km || 
|-id=921 bgcolor=#fefefe
| 155921 ||  || — || July 29, 2001 || Anderson Mesa || LONEOS || FLO || align=right | 5.1 km || 
|-id=922 bgcolor=#fefefe
| 155922 ||  || — || August 10, 2001 || Haleakala || NEAT || — || align=right | 1.2 km || 
|-id=923 bgcolor=#fefefe
| 155923 ||  || — || August 14, 2001 || San Marcello || L. Tesi, A. Boattini || — || align=right | 1.5 km || 
|-id=924 bgcolor=#fefefe
| 155924 ||  || — || August 11, 2001 || Haleakala || NEAT || — || align=right | 1.2 km || 
|-id=925 bgcolor=#fefefe
| 155925 ||  || — || August 13, 2001 || Haleakala || NEAT || — || align=right data-sort-value="0.99" | 990 m || 
|-id=926 bgcolor=#fefefe
| 155926 ||  || — || August 15, 2001 || San Marcello || L. Tesi, M. Tombelli || NYS || align=right | 1.2 km || 
|-id=927 bgcolor=#fefefe
| 155927 ||  || — || August 13, 2001 || Haleakala || NEAT || — || align=right | 1.5 km || 
|-id=928 bgcolor=#FA8072
| 155928 ||  || — || August 13, 2001 || Haleakala || NEAT || — || align=right | 1.4 km || 
|-id=929 bgcolor=#fefefe
| 155929 ||  || — || August 14, 2001 || Haleakala || NEAT || NYS || align=right data-sort-value="0.93" | 930 m || 
|-id=930 bgcolor=#fefefe
| 155930 ||  || — || August 14, 2001 || Haleakala || NEAT || MAS || align=right | 1.1 km || 
|-id=931 bgcolor=#fefefe
| 155931 ||  || — || August 14, 2001 || Haleakala || NEAT || FLO || align=right data-sort-value="0.95" | 950 m || 
|-id=932 bgcolor=#fefefe
| 155932 ||  || — || August 16, 2001 || Socorro || LINEAR || — || align=right | 1.2 km || 
|-id=933 bgcolor=#E9E9E9
| 155933 ||  || — || August 16, 2001 || Socorro || LINEAR || — || align=right | 1.6 km || 
|-id=934 bgcolor=#fefefe
| 155934 ||  || — || August 16, 2001 || Socorro || LINEAR || NYS || align=right | 1.2 km || 
|-id=935 bgcolor=#fefefe
| 155935 ||  || — || August 16, 2001 || Socorro || LINEAR || — || align=right | 1.4 km || 
|-id=936 bgcolor=#fefefe
| 155936 ||  || — || August 16, 2001 || Socorro || LINEAR || — || align=right | 1.3 km || 
|-id=937 bgcolor=#fefefe
| 155937 ||  || — || August 16, 2001 || Socorro || LINEAR || NYS || align=right | 1.8 km || 
|-id=938 bgcolor=#fefefe
| 155938 ||  || — || August 17, 2001 || Palomar || NEAT || — || align=right data-sort-value="0.99" | 990 m || 
|-id=939 bgcolor=#fefefe
| 155939 ||  || — || August 16, 2001 || Socorro || LINEAR || — || align=right | 1.2 km || 
|-id=940 bgcolor=#fefefe
| 155940 ||  || — || August 16, 2001 || Socorro || LINEAR || NYS || align=right | 1.00 km || 
|-id=941 bgcolor=#fefefe
| 155941 ||  || — || August 16, 2001 || Socorro || LINEAR || — || align=right | 1.3 km || 
|-id=942 bgcolor=#fefefe
| 155942 ||  || — || August 16, 2001 || Socorro || LINEAR || FLO || align=right | 1.1 km || 
|-id=943 bgcolor=#fefefe
| 155943 ||  || — || August 16, 2001 || Socorro || LINEAR || — || align=right | 1.4 km || 
|-id=944 bgcolor=#fefefe
| 155944 ||  || — || August 16, 2001 || Socorro || LINEAR || NYS || align=right | 1.2 km || 
|-id=945 bgcolor=#fefefe
| 155945 ||  || — || August 16, 2001 || Socorro || LINEAR || NYS || align=right data-sort-value="0.98" | 980 m || 
|-id=946 bgcolor=#fefefe
| 155946 ||  || — || August 17, 2001 || Socorro || LINEAR || — || align=right | 1.4 km || 
|-id=947 bgcolor=#fefefe
| 155947 ||  || — || August 17, 2001 || Socorro || LINEAR || — || align=right | 1.8 km || 
|-id=948 bgcolor=#fefefe
| 155948 Maquet ||  ||  || August 21, 2001 || Pic du Midi || Pic du Midi Obs. || — || align=right | 1.2 km || 
|-id=949 bgcolor=#fefefe
| 155949 ||  || — || August 16, 2001 || Socorro || LINEAR || V || align=right | 1.6 km || 
|-id=950 bgcolor=#fefefe
| 155950 ||  || — || August 16, 2001 || Socorro || LINEAR || — || align=right | 2.1 km || 
|-id=951 bgcolor=#fefefe
| 155951 ||  || — || August 22, 2001 || Desert Eagle || W. K. Y. Yeung || V || align=right | 1.1 km || 
|-id=952 bgcolor=#fefefe
| 155952 ||  || — || August 19, 2001 || Socorro || LINEAR || — || align=right | 1.2 km || 
|-id=953 bgcolor=#E9E9E9
| 155953 ||  || — || August 22, 2001 || Socorro || LINEAR || — || align=right | 2.1 km || 
|-id=954 bgcolor=#d6d6d6
| 155954 ||  || — || August 22, 2001 || Kitt Peak || Spacewatch || 3:2 || align=right | 6.7 km || 
|-id=955 bgcolor=#fefefe
| 155955 ||  || — || August 17, 2001 || Socorro || LINEAR || — || align=right | 2.0 km || 
|-id=956 bgcolor=#fefefe
| 155956 ||  || — || August 22, 2001 || Socorro || LINEAR || FLO || align=right | 1.4 km || 
|-id=957 bgcolor=#fefefe
| 155957 ||  || — || August 20, 2001 || Socorro || LINEAR || — || align=right | 1.3 km || 
|-id=958 bgcolor=#FA8072
| 155958 ||  || — || August 18, 2001 || Anderson Mesa || LONEOS || — || align=right | 2.0 km || 
|-id=959 bgcolor=#d6d6d6
| 155959 ||  || — || August 20, 2001 || Socorro || LINEAR || HIL3:2 || align=right | 9.1 km || 
|-id=960 bgcolor=#fefefe
| 155960 ||  || — || August 21, 2001 || Kitt Peak || Spacewatch || NYS || align=right data-sort-value="0.86" | 860 m || 
|-id=961 bgcolor=#fefefe
| 155961 ||  || — || August 24, 2001 || Kitt Peak || Spacewatch || — || align=right data-sort-value="0.93" | 930 m || 
|-id=962 bgcolor=#fefefe
| 155962 ||  || — || August 24, 2001 || Kitt Peak || Spacewatch || KLI || align=right | 3.4 km || 
|-id=963 bgcolor=#fefefe
| 155963 ||  || — || August 23, 2001 || Anderson Mesa || LONEOS || — || align=right | 2.6 km || 
|-id=964 bgcolor=#fefefe
| 155964 ||  || — || August 29, 2001 || Palomar || NEAT || — || align=right | 1.9 km || 
|-id=965 bgcolor=#fefefe
| 155965 ||  || — || August 22, 2001 || Socorro || LINEAR || ERI || align=right | 3.3 km || 
|-id=966 bgcolor=#fefefe
| 155966 ||  || — || August 23, 2001 || Anderson Mesa || LONEOS || — || align=right | 1.3 km || 
|-id=967 bgcolor=#fefefe
| 155967 ||  || — || August 23, 2001 || Anderson Mesa || LONEOS || EUT || align=right | 1.9 km || 
|-id=968 bgcolor=#fefefe
| 155968 ||  || — || August 23, 2001 || Anderson Mesa || LONEOS || — || align=right | 1.0 km || 
|-id=969 bgcolor=#fefefe
| 155969 ||  || — || August 23, 2001 || Kitt Peak || Spacewatch || NYS || align=right | 2.6 km || 
|-id=970 bgcolor=#fefefe
| 155970 ||  || — || August 23, 2001 || Kitt Peak || Spacewatch || — || align=right | 1.2 km || 
|-id=971 bgcolor=#fefefe
| 155971 ||  || — || August 24, 2001 || Socorro || LINEAR || — || align=right data-sort-value="0.95" | 950 m || 
|-id=972 bgcolor=#fefefe
| 155972 ||  || — || August 24, 2001 || Anderson Mesa || LONEOS || CHL || align=right | 2.9 km || 
|-id=973 bgcolor=#fefefe
| 155973 ||  || — || August 24, 2001 || Socorro || LINEAR || — || align=right | 1.4 km || 
|-id=974 bgcolor=#fefefe
| 155974 ||  || — || August 24, 2001 || Socorro || LINEAR || NYS || align=right | 1.4 km || 
|-id=975 bgcolor=#fefefe
| 155975 ||  || — || August 24, 2001 || Socorro || LINEAR || V || align=right | 1.0 km || 
|-id=976 bgcolor=#fefefe
| 155976 ||  || — || August 24, 2001 || Socorro || LINEAR || V || align=right | 1.4 km || 
|-id=977 bgcolor=#fefefe
| 155977 ||  || — || August 24, 2001 || Socorro || LINEAR || FLO || align=right | 1.3 km || 
|-id=978 bgcolor=#fefefe
| 155978 ||  || — || August 24, 2001 || Socorro || LINEAR || — || align=right | 1.1 km || 
|-id=979 bgcolor=#fefefe
| 155979 ||  || — || August 24, 2001 || Socorro || LINEAR || — || align=right | 1.2 km || 
|-id=980 bgcolor=#fefefe
| 155980 ||  || — || August 24, 2001 || Socorro || LINEAR || NYS || align=right | 1.6 km || 
|-id=981 bgcolor=#fefefe
| 155981 ||  || — || August 24, 2001 || Socorro || LINEAR || NYS || align=right | 1.3 km || 
|-id=982 bgcolor=#fefefe
| 155982 ||  || — || August 24, 2001 || Socorro || LINEAR || — || align=right | 1.2 km || 
|-id=983 bgcolor=#fefefe
| 155983 ||  || — || August 24, 2001 || Haleakala || NEAT || — || align=right | 1.3 km || 
|-id=984 bgcolor=#fefefe
| 155984 ||  || — || August 25, 2001 || Socorro || LINEAR || — || align=right | 1.4 km || 
|-id=985 bgcolor=#fefefe
| 155985 ||  || — || August 25, 2001 || Socorro || LINEAR || — || align=right | 1.5 km || 
|-id=986 bgcolor=#fefefe
| 155986 ||  || — || August 25, 2001 || Socorro || LINEAR || FLO || align=right | 1.2 km || 
|-id=987 bgcolor=#fefefe
| 155987 ||  || — || August 25, 2001 || Socorro || LINEAR || V || align=right | 1.1 km || 
|-id=988 bgcolor=#fefefe
| 155988 ||  || — || August 25, 2001 || Socorro || LINEAR || — || align=right | 1.4 km || 
|-id=989 bgcolor=#fefefe
| 155989 ||  || — || August 20, 2001 || Socorro || LINEAR || — || align=right | 3.9 km || 
|-id=990 bgcolor=#fefefe
| 155990 ||  || — || August 18, 2001 || Anderson Mesa || LONEOS || FLO || align=right | 1.3 km || 
|-id=991 bgcolor=#fefefe
| 155991 ||  || — || August 18, 2001 || Palomar || NEAT || — || align=right | 2.8 km || 
|-id=992 bgcolor=#fefefe
| 155992 ||  || — || August 24, 2001 || Socorro || LINEAR || FLO || align=right | 1.3 km || 
|-id=993 bgcolor=#fefefe
| 155993 ||  || — || September 7, 2001 || Socorro || LINEAR || NYS || align=right | 1.2 km || 
|-id=994 bgcolor=#fefefe
| 155994 ||  || — || September 11, 2001 || Socorro || LINEAR || — || align=right | 1.2 km || 
|-id=995 bgcolor=#fefefe
| 155995 ||  || — || September 9, 2001 || Desert Eagle || W. K. Y. Yeung || — || align=right | 1.2 km || 
|-id=996 bgcolor=#fefefe
| 155996 ||  || — || September 10, 2001 || Desert Eagle || W. K. Y. Yeung || — || align=right | 3.3 km || 
|-id=997 bgcolor=#fefefe
| 155997 ||  || — || September 12, 2001 || San Marcello || A. Boattini, M. Tombelli || — || align=right | 3.9 km || 
|-id=998 bgcolor=#fefefe
| 155998 ||  || — || September 7, 2001 || Socorro || LINEAR || — || align=right | 1.9 km || 
|-id=999 bgcolor=#fefefe
| 155999 ||  || — || September 7, 2001 || Socorro || LINEAR || — || align=right data-sort-value="0.94" | 940 m || 
|-id=000 bgcolor=#fefefe
| 156000 ||  || — || September 7, 2001 || Socorro || LINEAR || — || align=right | 1.3 km || 
|}

References

External links 
 Discovery Circumstances: Numbered Minor Planets (155001)–(160000) (IAU Minor Planet Center)

0155